= Hitori (disambiguation) =

Hitori is a logic puzzle.

Hitori (Japanese: ひとり, lit. 'alone') may also refer to:

== Songs ==
- "Hitori" (song), by Mika Nakashima
- "Hitori" (ja), by Gospellers
- "Hitori" (ja), by Yui Asaka
- "Hitori" (ja), by Miyuki Nakajima

== Other uses ==
- Hitori Kumagai (born 1936), Japanese writer
- Hitori (album), by Jun Shibata
- Hitori Gotō, a.k.a. Bocchi, the title character of the anime/manga series Bocchi the Rock!
