= Jerry Whitworth =

American spy

Jerry Alfred Whitworth
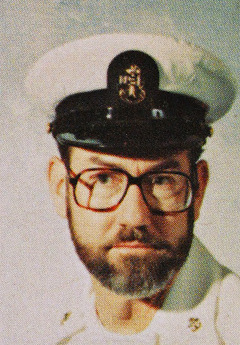
- Jerry Alfred Whitworth, circa 1985
- Born: August 10, 1939 (age 87); Muldrow, Oklahoma, U.S.
- Occupation: United States Navy communications specialist
- Status: Incarcerated: Federal Correctional Institution, Victorville
- Motive: Financial gain
- Conviction: Espionage
- Criminal charge: Espionage
- Penalty: 365 years, fined $410,000

Jerry Alfred Whitworth (born August 10, 1939) was sentenced to 365 years for his part in the Walker family spy ring, which, at the time of Whitworth's arrest, U.S. authorities described as "the most damaging espionage ring uncovered in the United States in three decades".

== Early life ==
Whitworth was born in his grandparents' house next door to the New Covenant Free Will Baptist Church in the Paw Paw Bottoms of the Arkansas River, seven miles south-east of Muldrow, Oklahoma.

Whitworth came from a broken home. His father left his mother and moved to California before he was one year old. His mother had died shortly afterwards, so his maternal grandparents and one uncle were awarded guardianship. The family breakup had hit the young Whitworth hard, and he had trouble making friends in school. At the time of his arrest, a now-retired educator who had been one of Whitworth's teachers in elementary school noted he "seemed to struggle to find a place to belong".

== US Navy service ==
In September 1956, at the age of 17, Whitworth joined the Naval Reserve at Fort Smith, Arkansas. He was advanced to storekeeper third class in June 1959. By the early 1960s, Whitworth left the Navy and was a student at Coalinga College, a community college in Coalinga which is now known as West Hills College Coalinga, and was planning to go on to study engineering at the University of California. However, deciding that this would take too long, he decided to re-join the navy and make it his permanent career. He went on active duty at Naval Air Station Alameda in September 1962. Whitworth used his first weekend pass from Alameda to go to Mendota, where he learned his father resided, not having seen him since infancy.

Whitworth was transferred to Naval Air Station Los Alamitos in January 1965 where he decided to convert from storekeeper to radioman. He graduated from radioman A school at United States Naval Training Center Bainbridge in 1966 and spent a year with Tactical Air Command squadron TACRon 12. He was advanced to radioman second class in April 1967 and returned to school at Naval Training Center San Diego. Upon completion of that training in February 1968 and a few more months of training in Washington, D.C. he was transferred to the communications relay ship USS Arlington. Whitworth was advanced to radioman first class in April 1969 and transferred to USS Ranger (CVA-61) in August for the aircraft carrier's fifth combat deployment to Vietnam. Whitworth was then ordered to attend a satellite communications school at Naval Training Center San Diego, where he graduated and did well enough to be assigned a teaching position at the same school. While teaching, he reported to the director of the program, John Anthony Walker. Whitworth had gained a reputation for being dedicated to his Navy work, but others also noticed an overwhelming effort in him to try and fit in. This was also noticed by Walker, who sensed an easy mark in expanding his spy ring, and befriended Whitworth by offering to spend weekends together sailing. The boat, acquired with Soviet money from spying, was christened Dirty Old Man.

Whitworth left San Diego in February 1973 to work at the communications center on Diego Garcia, which served as the primary communications relay facility for reconnaissance aircraft, surveillance satellites, and National Security Agency listening operations in and around the Indian Ocean. After receiving a commendation for his work on Diego Garcia in August 1973, he re-enlisted in November 1974 with the promise of training in satellite communications operations at the Army Communications Electronic School at Fort Monmouth. Whitworth returned to Diego Garcia as a satellite communications specialist in March 1975, where he was awarded the Navy Achievement Medal for his performance as the petty-officer-in-charge of the satellite communications division and technical control facility. During his final year on Diego Garcia, the Navy began construction of a secret satellite intelligence facility code-named Classic Wizard intended to eavesdrop on radar and communications signals of Soviet ships.

In June 1976 Whitworth reported aboard the aircraft carrier USS Constellation where his responsibilities included operation and maintenance of all communications systems, including the Navy's new Gapfiller satellite communications, and supervision of use of the ship's cryptographic equipment. Whitworth left Constellation in 1978 and was assigned as the chief radioman and classified material systems custodian aboard the supply ship USS Niagara Falls, the same ship upon which John Walker had served as communications officer after leaving Fleet Training Center San Diego in 1971. Whitworth was assigned to the telecommunications center at Naval Air Station Alameda from September 1979, and then to the fleet satellite communications station at Stockton, California, before returning to sea as a communications watch officer supervising cryptographic technicians aboard the aircraft carrier USS Enterprise from October 1982 until retirement from the Navy a year later.

== Soviet spying activity ==
Whitworth agreed to help John Walker in getting highly classified communications data in 1973; from then until his retirement in 1983, his work for the navy involved encrypted communications and required security clearance. At first, Walker told Whitworth that the information was going to Israel, which made espionage sound more palatable with an ally. However, after learning the recipient was the Soviet Union, their relationship became strained. Whitworth continued to provide the material, but felt Walker was being duped in only getting several thousand dollars a month for information that would have cost the USSR tens of millions of dollars to obtain had they used technical penetration, i.e. "bugs".

Whitworth married for the first time in 1967 but his wife left him within a year. She committed suicide in 1974 but he did not learn this until around 1980. He married a second time in 1976, to a woman 15 years his junior, and was still married to her at the time of his arrest.

Less than six months after he retired from the Navy, Whitworth seemed to try to get out of espionage. In early May 1984, he wrote to the FBI in San Francisco, using the pseudonym "Rus". He said that he had been spying for several years, passing secret cryptographic lists for military communications. He said that there were at least three other people in his spy ring and offered to cooperate with the authorities provided he received immunity. He wrote again in late May 1984, again asking for immunity and saying that the spy ring had been operating for more than 20 years. He seems to have changed his mind during that summer—his final letter, dated mid-August 1984, said that he thought "it would be best to give up on the idea of aiding in the termination of the espionage ring previously discussed".

Whitworth's retirement was formalized by the Navy on October 31, 1983. He then attended school to become a stockbroker, and had taken his stockbroker's exam in 1985. Shortly afterwards, Whitworth was arrested. While imprisoned, he was informed via mail that he was not to be awarded his stockbroker's license due to failure of the exam.

== Arrest, prosecution and imprisonment ==
John Walker's former wife reported his spying to the FBI, in revenge for his failure to pay alimony. Shortly after Walker was arrested on 20 May 1985, Walker's son, Michael, and Walker's brother, Arthur, were arrested. Barbara Walker had never met Jerry Whitworth, and his role in the spy ring was tougher to uncover. Through Whitworth's 1984 letters to the FBI, John Walker's poorly-coded letters to the KGB which identified him as "D", and Barbara Walker remembering her ex-husband often mentioning a friend (though she could not recollect if his true name was "Wentworth" or "Whitworth"), the FBI was finally able to pinpoint Jerry Whitworth, and he was arrested on 3 June 1985. Walker entered into a plea bargain, agreeing to testify against Whitworth, apparently mainly in return for lenient treatment of his son. But Walker also received more lenient treatment than the man he had recruited—Walker would have been eligible for parole in May 2015 (he died on August 29, 2014, in prison). Whitworth ended up receiving the harshest punishment of the spy quartet, being fined $410,000 and sentenced to 365 years imprisonment.
