= Soviet computing technology smuggling =

Illegal import of computers

Soviet computing technology smuggling, both attempted and actual, was a response to CoCom (Coordinating Committee for Multilateral Export Controls) restrictions on technology transfer.

== History ==
=== Mainframe successes ===
Initially the Soviet Union focused on mainframe computing technology, particularly the IBM 360 and 370. Between 1967 and 1972 much effort went into reverse engineering what they "acquired." Their first IBM-like machine was based on a 360/40 smuggled in via Poland. The second Soviet-built machine was from a 370/145. Their focus subsequently shifted to super-minicomputers. Failure in 1983 to import a VAX-11/782 did not stop their efforts. "Reverse-engineered and copied Apple IIe parts" brought microcomputers to the Soviet Union; it also brought computer viruses too. IBM PC compatible computers were also smuggled in.

Production of Iron Curtain mainframes, at one point, was estimated to be 180 per year.

=== VAX failures ===
The failure of the Soviets to acquire a VAX-11/782, a dual-processor variation of the VAX-11/780, the original VAX, unraveled much of their smuggling system. U. S. Secretary of Defense Caspar Weinberger made a public display of the system, about which The Washington Post headlined "Seized Computer Put on Display" in later 1983. The computer had been exported from the United States to South Africa, from which it was to clandestinely be reshipped; it was seized "moments before its scheduled shipment to the Soviet Union." Weinberger stated at a news conference that the VAX was intended for assisting production of "vastly more accurate . . . and more destructive weapons."

Like the 360/40, the smuggling process involved multiple shipments. The 360 had been disassembled and placed in a large number of suitcases. A smaller number of "huge containers of parts" held the 782. The latter's route involved transhipping, some more than half via Sweden, others via West Germany. A U.S. official describe potential "military uses, including the operation of a missile guidance system."

The exact configuration was not released even by over a year later: APnews, which noted that the smuggling operation was spread across ten countries, cited $1.1 million as the system's price The Los Angeles Times described the same system's price as $1.5 million. The New York Times wrote "between $1.5 and $2 million."

Another VAX-smuggling attempt, five years later, involved a VAX 8800; this too ended in a failure. This time also, the computer involved was a dual-processor system. American government wiretapping revealed that some of the parties involved considered even settling for a VAX 8700, a uni-processor system.

== See also ==
- Toshiba–Kongsberg scandal
