= KL-51 =

Keyboard encryption system

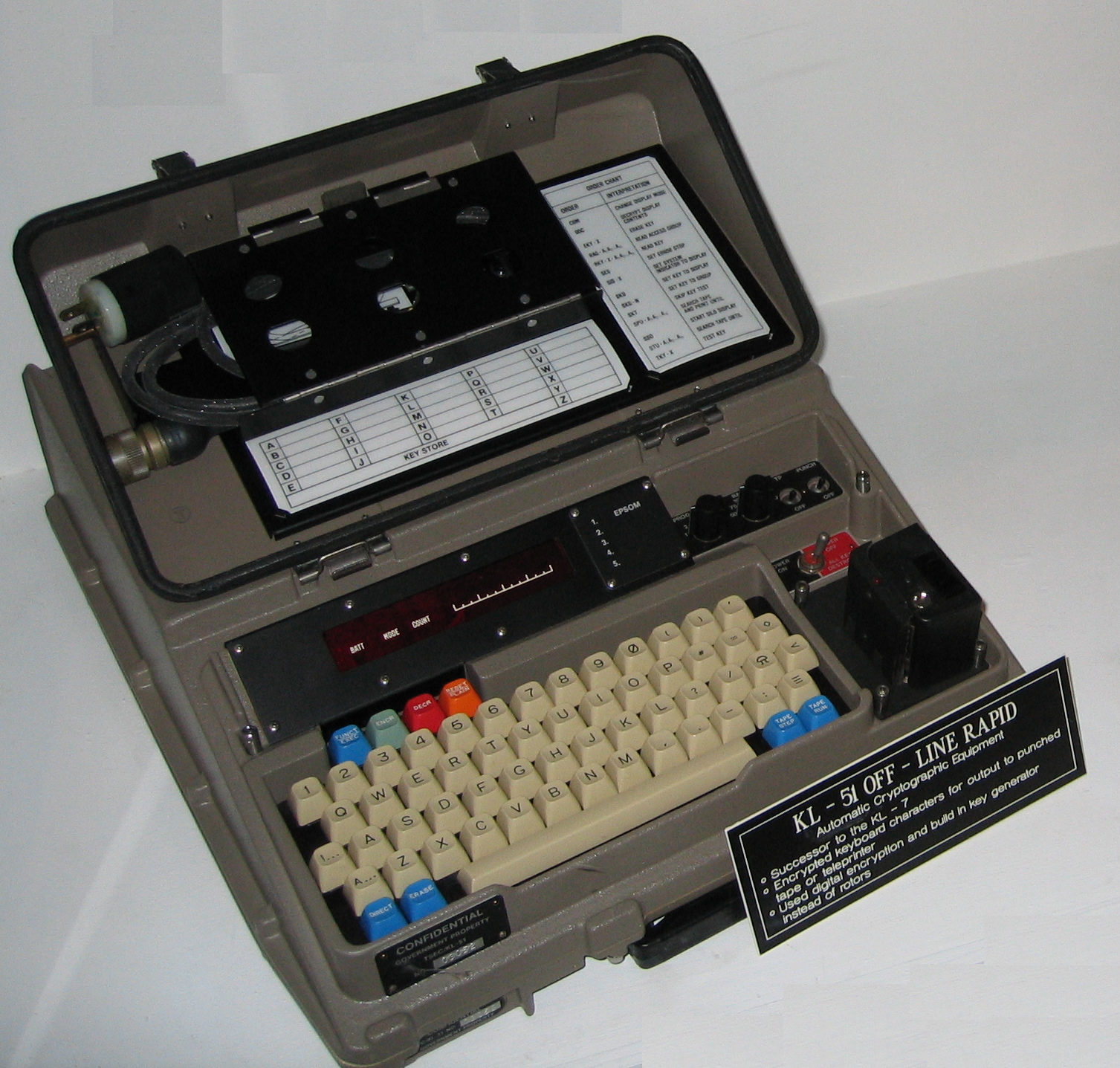
KL-51 on display at the National Cryptologic Museum in 2005

The KL-51 is an off-line keyboard encryption system that read and punched paper tape for use with teleprinters. In NATO it was called RACE (Rapid Automatic Cryptographic Equipment).

It was developed in the 1970s by a Norwegian company, Standard Telefon og Kabelfabrik (STK). It used digital electronics for encryption instead of rotors, and it may have been the first machine to use software based crypto algorithms. KL-51 is a very robust machine made to military specifications.

U.S. National Security Agency bought it in the 1980s to replace the earlier KL-7. As of 2006, the U.S. Navy was developing plans to replace KL-51 units still in use with a unit based on a more modern Universal Crypto Device.

== Sources ==
- NSA museum caption shown in photo.
- Crypto Machines - KL-51/RACE
- http://www.knobstick.ca/pdf_files/race1.pdf
