= NetCentrics =

US federal government contractor

- Founded: 1995
- Founder: Bob Dixon and Bob Dougherty
- Fate: Acquired by Cerberus Capital Management in October 2021
- Website: netcentrics.com

NetCentrics Corporation, based in Herndon, Virginia, is a contractor to the US federal government, the United States Department of Homeland Security and Federal Civilian Agencies. NetCentrics provides enterprise IT, cloud and cybersecurity services to government and private industry. The headquarters are located inside the Dulles Technology Corridor of NoVA. The workforce is a combination of on-site and off-site employees. Many employees are remote workers from the greater National Capital Region and Washington, D.C. Most employees have security clearances (Secret, Top Secret, etc.), depending on role.

== History ==
NetCentrics was founded in 1995 by Bob Dixon and Bob Dougherty, the company's first CEO. The company name derived from being one of the first "netcentric" government contractors at the time. An early contract with the U.S. Army at the Pentagon resulted in employee presence there on 9/11. No employees were harmed. Later, three NetCentrics employees were recognized for their efforts to restore digital communications immediately after the attack.

In August 2014, NetCentrics was acquired by Haystax Technology; terms were not released.

Starting in 2016, NetCentrics operated as a stand-alone entity, under company president Cynthia Barreda.

In October 2019, NetCentrics lost a $269.9 million Defense Department IT contract, on which it was the incumbent, to NCI Information Systems (now Empower AI) after a lengthy legal battle; the company laid off 95 employees because of this lost contract.

In October 2021, NetCentrics was acquired by an affiliate of private equity firm Cerberus Capital Management and appointed Kenny Cushing as CEO; terms were not disclosed.

== Leadership ==
Kenneth Cushing became chief executive officer in October 2021.

In January 2020, Lawrence O'Connor was named president, replacing the previous CEO. He was named NetCentrics CEO in July, 2021.

== Contract vehicles ==
NetCentrics provides services to the federal government through contract vehicle awards. Contract vehicles are competitively bid and typically last several years.

Current contract vehicles include:

- DISA Encore III
- FTC Information Technology Support Service (ITSS) Blank Purchase Agreement (BPA) (FTC ITSS BPA)
- GSA Schedule 70
- GSA Schedule 70 - HAC SIN (cybersecurity)
- SeaPort Next Generation (SeaPort NxG)

== Partnerships, mentorships and joint ventures ==
NetCentrics established a Mentor-Protégé with Broadleaf, a Native Hawaiian Organization (NHO)-owned small business, in 2017. This SBA 8(a) program gives Broadleaf access to NetCentrics' expertise in cybersecurity, network management; expands offerings for federal customers.

The company established a similar relationship with Osprey Technology Solutions, Inc., a Woman-Owned Small Business (WOSB) and Minority Business (MBE) certified company. Osprey TSI provides information technology hardware, software, engineering, installation, testing and maintenance services to both government and private clients. It also provides various technological and cybersecurity solutions, as well as intraoperative neurophysiological monitoring services for a wide variety of surgical procedures. The joint venture between NetCentrics and Osprey TSI is called NetSprey and serves the healthcare sector.

== Awards ==
NetCentrics was recognized by Comparably in 2017 and again in 2018, receiving a total of 13 awards including Best Companies in DC, Best CEO, Best Company for Diversity, and Best Company Outlook. In 2018, NetCentrics was recognized by DCA Live as one of the fastest growing cybersecurity companies in the Washington metropolitan area.

In 2021, NetCentrics scored as a "Best Place to Work in Washington, D.C." by employees, ranking #11 in the region for workplace culture and leadership approval. The company also won a "Best Leadership award", ranking #27 nationally for small and medium-sized companies, also by Comparably. In October the company received a "Best Work-Life Balance" award, ranking #38 nationally in the small business category.
