= KG-13 =

The KG-13 was the first transistorized cryptographic machine developed by the NSA in the early 60's. It used the newly developed 2N404 germanium transistor instead of vacuum tubes. It consisted of a KG-3 transmitter and a KG-12 receiver. The transmitter used about 500 transistors and the receiver about 300. The transmitter was switchable to function as a receiver.

== KG-13 (PONTUS) ==
The KG-13 Electronic Key Generator, Transmitter/Receiver was similar in appearance to the KG-14. This solid state design dating from the mid-to-late 1960s, originally cost $13,000 per copy. It was one of the first crypto machines to encrypt data such as facsimile. Crypto technicians received 10 to 12 weeks training on the machine. The KG-13 was composed of a KG-3 transmitter and a KG-12 receiver.

A KG-13 unit. One drawer bears the designation KGD-3/TSEC. The total weight is around 250 pounds. The KG-13 was controlled by "key cards". These were IBM-like punch cards that determined the starting point of the KG-13 encryption which was done by "koken stages". The key cards were changed daily at HJ time. When the USS Pueblo, with a KG-13 aboard, was captured by the North Koreans in 1968, the personnel didn't have time to destroy it. As a result, a working model of the KG-13 fell into enemy hands. NSA quickly designed a modification to the koken stage board to alter its operation in order that the enemy didn't have an identical working model.

=== Card Reader Description ===
Select this link to see the inside of the card reader. Ronald Coppock, who worked with the KG-13 indicates that it was fitted with a card cutter and also without. "In Ethiopia, I worked at two locations (Stonehouse and Tract C) that had KG13's equipped with the KW26 style card cutters. All the machines at Stonehouse were equipped that way and about 20% at Tract C. At the 7th Radio Research in South East Asia, about 30% of the KG13's had the card cutter style card readers. 13's equipped with the card cutters were operated on very high priority circuits with short cycles to change key material. Some were on 6 hour and others on 12 hour cycles".

The KG-13 did have a major difference in that in its latter years, it was equipped with a Card Reader Insert Board or CRIB.

=== Internal Description ===
The KG-13 employed "FLYBALL" modules. These were modules made of discrete components set up as logic element circuit groups such as NAND gates, NOR gates, XOR gates, flip flops, monostables, multivibrators, etc. Once tested, the modules were potted in a compound whose colour indicated their function. The coloured potting compound was extremely hard and any attempt to penetrate it resulted in damage to the internal circuitry.

In a KG-13, the following colours are confirmed: Pink, Yellow, Green, Blue, Red, Orange and Black. Purple and Brown modules were probably used but those colours are unconfirmed as of this time. Yellow modules were single transistor emitter follower clock drivers. Pink modules were two transistor shift register flip flops. Each yellow module drove nine pink ones. A two transistor multivibrator module drove the audio alarm thru an amplifier. Two transistor monostables were also used. NAND and NOR modules were built from a single transistor and XOR modules were built from two transistors. Failures usually occurred in the power supplies, buffers, and synchronizers though most problems were quickly resolved. When new, there was a high frequency of failures due to cold solder joints.

One board in the KG-13 had a black module which was a noise generator containing a Zener diode noise source. This was the only classified module because the noise was used to randomize the key stream on startup. The circuitry inside the module then used the koken chain shift registers to create a pseudo random key stream. That was why there was no problem in restarting the KG-13 with the same card. The noise source ensured that the chances of duplicating the start point was negligible.

Two of the key cards were for the transmitter and the third for the receiver. There were two for the transmitter because it had two key generators. The keystream mixed with the plain text produced the ciphertext. Two key generators generating the same keystream should match bit for bit at the output and a mismatch would cause a crypto alarm and a shutdown of the output. A key generator failure would stop transmission and prevent a compromise. With only a single key generator in the transmitter a failure could produce a trivial keystream (all one's, all zero's or alternations). A receiver key generator failure just produced garble. The KG-3 could be used to transmit or receive since there is a XMIT/RECV switch on in the lower right hand portion of the lowest unit.

In the 1964/65 time frame, crypto techs were taught that it would take 50,000 years to break the key on a KG-13 using state of the art techniques which were available at the time. The KG-13 also employed traffic flow security.

Steve Gardner recalls "One of our operations sites which monitored satellites used an item called a "shark" between the teletype and the KG-13. It was a block message transceiver". KG-13's were taken out of service around 1989–90. This was one of the last discrete component crypto machines built. Shortly after this time, integrated circuits started to appear in crypto machine designs.

An illustrated article describing its arrival at the museum appeared in the Spring 2004 issue of the NCMF internal publication, "The Link". As of 2010, the KG-13 is in storage.
