= Toshiba–Kongsberg scandal =

Cold War controversy

The Toshiba–Kongsberg scandal, referred to in Japan as the Toshiba Machine Cocom violation case, was an international trade incident that unfolded during the final period of the Cold War. It centered on certain Coordinating Committee for Multilateral Export Controls (CoCom) member nations who transgressed foreign exchange and foreign trade laws by exporting machine tools to the Soviet Union. These tools, when combined with Kongsberg numerical control (NC) devices manufactured in Norway, contravened the CoCom agreement. The equipment allowed the submarine technology of the Soviet Union to progress significantly as it was being used to machine quieter propellers for Soviet submarines.

The incident strained relations between the United States and Japan and resulted in the arrest and prosecution of two senior executives, as well as the imposition of sanctions on Kongsberg by both countries.

== The Incident ==
The Toshiba Machine division (at that time) was a 50.1% subsidiary of Toshiba, a major Japanese manufacturer of machine tools and a general electronics manufacturer. Toshiba Machine's sales to the entire Toshiba Group accounted for about 10%, and Toshiba Machine's exports to the communist bloc accounted for less than 20% of total sales.

Between December 1982 to 1984, Toshiba Machine supplied eight "machine tools", NC devices, and associated software to control the machine tools to the Soviet Union's Technical Machinery Import Corporation through Wako Trading, a dummy company of Itochu Corporation. Exported via route was a high-performance model capable of simultaneous 9-axis control, for which exports were prohibited through the Coordinating Committee for Multilateral Export Controls (CoCom). Despite these controls, Toshiba Machine and Itochu Corporation exported the machines to the Soviet Union from 1982 to 1983 and modified associated software in 1984.

Toshiba Machine, Itochu Corporation, and the Wako Trading Co. Ltd. employees recognized that exporting to the communist bloc of the "machine tools" ordered by the Soviet Union was not permitted. Wako created a false export permit application claiming it was exporting a large vertical lathe for control. For proof, they provided a signed contract to reassemble it overseas. The Japanese Ministry of International Trade and Industry, in charge of export control, did not see through the falsification of the permit application.

=== Discovery and immediate aftermath ===
At the end of 1986, the U.S. federal government learned of this transaction from an informant at Wako Trading, an employee called Hitori Kumagai. The Pentagon conducted an investigation and concluded that the contract had contributed to the recent rapid improvement in the quietness of the Soviet Union Navy's nuclear-powered attack submarines. It subsequently notified the Japanese government through Atsuyuki Sasa, Director of the Cabinet Security Office, in a report in March 1987, the first report on the incident.

On the 19th, the Pentagon issued a statement that the U.S. government had learned that Japanese machine tooling, used to make screws for submarines, had been sent to the Soviet Union and that this was suspected of violating CoCom regulations. It announced that the Japanese government had been requested to conduct an investigation. According to sources familiar with the matter, the machine tool in question was believed to be a product of Toshiba Machine, a 50% subsidiary of Toshiba. The tooling was believed to be a type of milling machine used to make propeller blades for ships, a general-purpose technical product that can be diverted to military technology. The Soviet Union was said to be using it to develop and manufacture new blades to reduce the screw noise of submarines.

It continued to state that it was not clear when and how the Soviet Union had acquired the equipment. However, the US government pointed out that Norwegian weapons maker Kongsberg had also provided similar machine tooling. Using these acquisitions, the Soviet Union reduced screw noise, which is a clue to detect, identify, and track submarines. The reduction could make it difficult for the U.S. Navy to track Soviet submarines, according to the Pentagon.

For this reason, the US government requested the Japanese and Norwegian governments to investigate the circumstances under which these machines had been exported. It called for "appropriate action" to be taken based on the international understanding of CoCom and their respective domestic laws if violations of CoCom were revealed.

=== Investigation and trial ===
On April 30, 1987, the Japanese Police searched Toshiba Machine's premises. On May 27, two executives of Toshiba Machine were arrested for violating the Foreign Exchange Law, a Japanese domestic law, regarding the false application. A trial was held with Toshiba Machine being indicted.

On March 22, 1988, the Tokyo District Court handed down a judgment. Toshiba Machine was fined 2 million yen, and two executives were sentenced to 10 months in prison (with 3 years of suspension) and 1 year in prison (with 3 years of suspension). Chairman Shōichi Saba and president Ichiro Watarisugi resigned from their parent company Toshiba. The term of office of chairman Saba, who had been expected to become a major force at Toshiba, was cut short. He was succeeded by Joichi Aoi.

Ryuzo Sejima, an adviser to Itochu Corporation, was demoted. Sejima was the brains of the Nakasone Cabinet. However, statements made by second secretary Yuri Rastovorov and Ivan Kovalenko raised suspicions that he was a Soviet spy, which caused a stir.

=== Diplomatic and trade consequences ===
In the United States, in addition to restrictions for Toshiba Machine, the import of all products of the Toshiba Group, including Toshiba itself, was strictly prohibited. In addition, in front of the White House, there were emotional reactions, such as a performance in which members of Congress smashed Toshiba radio cassette players and TVs with hammers.

Congressman Hunter, the central figure in the investigation of Toshiba in Congress, severely criticized Toshiba for putting the lives of American soldiers in danger by exporting the tools because the range at which American nuclear submarines could detect Soviet nuclear submarines was reduced by 50%. He argued that it would be necessary to invest $30 billion to build 30 new nuclear submarines within 10 years.

In June 1988, Japan's Minister of International Trade and Industry, Hajime Tamura, acting on the orders of Prime Minister Yasuhiro Nakasone, traveled to the United States and formally apologized to US Secretary of Defense Caspar Weinberger.

In response to the affair, Toshiba carried out lobbying activities in Congress between 1987 and 1989 to ease the sanctions. The amount of money invested by Toshiba, the number of lobbyists, and the scale of its activities were said to be the largest ever. Houlihan, a lobbyist law firm, argued that Toshiba and Toshiba Machine were separate companies and had some success.

=== Details ===
The machine tool that combined with the Norwegian numerical control (NC) device and was exported to the Soviet Union (based on the Norwegian Police Service report).

Year	Kongsberg company model number	Manufacturer	Country	Number of axes in simultaneous control	Number	Destination	Usage
1974	CNC300	Sajo	Sweden	3	1	Stankoimport (1)	?
1975–1976	CNC300	GSP	France	5	23	Stankoimport (23)	?
1975–1976	CNC300	Forest	France	4–5	9	Leningrad (4)	Feather for turbines, model propeller
1975–1976	CNC300	Forest	France	4–5	9	Baltic Shipyard (3)	Screw
1975–1976	CNC300	Forest	France	4–5	9	Kiev (2)	Screw, propeller feather
1977–1985	NC2000	Sheath	West Germany	2	7	Leningrad (7)	Atomic energy machinery
1977–1985	NC2000	Sheath	West Germany	2	10	Sumy (4)	Atomic energy machinery
1977–1985	NC2000	Sheath	West Germany	2	10	? (1)	?
1977–1985	NC2000	Sheath	West Germany	2	10	Volgodonsk (5)	Atomic energy machinery
1977–1985	NC2000	Sheath	West Germany	3	24	Volgodonsk (21)	Atomic energy machinery
1977–1985	NC2000	Sheath	West Germany	3	24	Sumy (2)	?
1977–1985	NC2000	Sheath	West Germany	3	24	Leningrad (1)	?
1977–1985	NC2000	Sheath	West Germany	5	5	Leningrad (3)	Feather for turbines, other unknown
1977–1985	NC2000	Sheath	West Germany	5	5	Volgodonsk (1)	Atomic energy machinery
1977–1985	NC2000	Sheath	West Germany	5	5	Kazan (1)	?
1979–1981	NC2000	Delice	West Germany	2	12	Volgodonsk (8)	Atomic energy machinery
1979–1981	NC2000	Delice	West Germany	2	12	Aleksin (4)	?
1981	NC2000	Donauwerk	West Germany	3	2	? (2)	?
1981	NC2000	Donauwerk	West Germany	4	2	? (2)	?
1976–1985	NC2000	Innocenti	Italy	3	25	Volgodonsk (25)	Atomic energy machinery
1983–1984	NC2000	Forest	France	5	10	Leningrad (9)	Feather for turbines, other unknown
1983–1984	NC2000	Forest	France	5	10	Sverdlovsk (1)	Feather for turbines
1983–1984	NC2000	Forest	France	?	3	Volgodonsk (3)	Atomic energy machinery
1979–1984	NC2000	Toshiba	Japan	3	1	Volgodonsk (1)	Atomic energy machinery
1979–1984	NC2000	Toshiba	Japan	5	4	Baltic Shipyard (4)	Screw
1979–1984	NC2000	Toshiba	Japan	9	4	Baltic Shipyard (4)	Screw
1980	NC2000	KTM	United Kingdom	3	2	China (2)	?

== See also ==
- History of computing in the Soviet Union
- Soviet computing technology smuggling
