= 5-UCO =

The 5-UCO (5-Unit Controlled) was an on-line one-time tape Vernam cipher encryption system developed by the UK during World War II for use on teleprinter circuits. During the 1950s, it was used by the UK and the US for liaison on cryptanalysis.

5-UCO was fully synchronous, and therefore could be electrically regenerated on tandem high frequency (HF) radio links (i.e. one link connected to the next). It could operate directly with commercial circuits. The system also provided traffic-flow security (TFS). Another feature of the 5-UCO was that the receiving operator could maintain synchronisation if the path delay suddenly changed by "walking up and down" the key tape (one character at a time or one bit at a time). This procedure avoided the cumbersome task of a restart.

5-UCO required large amounts of key tape to operate on a continual basis. In 1960, supplying the key tape for a single 5-UCO in continuous use cost £5000 per year (equivalent to £116,000 in 2019). In the US, the logistical problems involved in the generation, supply and destruction of sufficient quantities of key tape limited its use to only the most sensitive traffic. The Army Security Agency sought to develop a replacement, an effort later taken over by the newly formed National Security Agency and resulting in the fielding of the KW-26 (ROMULUS) system.

Colonel G. Bellairs was awarded sums totalling £2250 for the development of 5-UCO, £750 in 1943, and £1,500 in 1960. Dr G. Timms and Mr D. C. Harwood were also awarded £1,000 for work on random tape for 5-UCO.

== See also ==
- Mercury
- Rockex
