= Hitori Kumagai =

Japanese whistleblower and writer

- Born: Kazuo Kumagai; June 10, 1936 (age 90); Onomichi, Hiroshima, Japan
- Education: Tokyo University of Foreign Studies
- Writing career
- Genre: Mystery fiction
- Notable awards: Suntory Mystery Award (1993)

Hitori Kumagai (熊谷 独, Kumagai Hitori), born Kazuo Kumagai (熊谷 一男, Kumagai Kazuo) on June 10, 1936, is a Japanese author and whistleblower who uncovered the Toshiba–Kongsberg scandal.

== Early life and education ==
Kumagai was born in Onomichi, Hiroshima. In 1963, he graduated from the Russian-language department of the Tokyo University of Foreign Studies in Fuchū.

== Toshiba–Kongsberg scandal ==
After graduation Kumagai worked for the Wako Koeki trading company (和光交易株式会社), which specialized in collaborating with communist countries. In October 1980, the KGB told a Wako executive in Moscow they were looking for "a robot which builds [propeller] screws for large vessels". Wako created a connection to the Toshiba Machine Corporation (東芝機械株式会社), which also specialized in collaborating with communist countries. The company began talks with the KGB in late December 1980, and the spy agency requested four sets of nine-axis machine tools and four sets of five-axis tools—violating Coordinating Committee for Multilateral Export Controls (CoCom) regulations for certain machine tools. Japan's Ministry of International Trade and Industry (MITI) advised the violation. The Itochu Corporation worked with Wako and Toshiba Machine, shifting responsibility for the violation to the other two companies in an agreement signed on April 24, 1981.

Shinto Jitsugyo Company (株式会社進展実業), which also specialized in working with communist countries, was a subsidiary of Itochu and the Shinko Seiki Company (神港精機株式会社). It violated CoCom regulations, exported germanium transistor production facilities to the Soviet Union. Another Itochu subsidiary, Ataka and Company (安宅産業株式会社), also worked with communist countries to export a set of three-axis machine tools.

Shipments
Date	Kongsberg NC device type	Manufacturer	Machine	Quantity	Destination	Use	Contract
September 1964	–	Shinko Seiki	Germanium transistor production	1		Germanium transistor	April 1963
December 1964	–	Shinko Seiki	Germanium transistor production	1		Germanium transistor	April 1963
September 25, 1979	NC2000	Toshiba Machine	3-axis machine tools	1	Volgodonsk	Atomic energy machinery	

=== Delivery ===
The numerical control machine tool was produced by Kongsberg Gruppen in Norway. They obtained export permission by claiming that it had two axes and delivered it to Japan, where it was re-exported to the Soviet Union. Its software later followed the same path.

Shipments
Date	NC device type	Manufacturer	Spindles	Quantity	Destination	Use	Contract
December 1982	NC2000	Toshiba Machine	9	1	Baltic Shipyard	Screw	April 24, 1981
February 1983	NC2000	Toshiba Machine	9	2	Baltic Shipyard	Screw	April 24, 1981
May 1983	NC2000	Toshiba Machine	9	3	Baltic Shipyard	Screw	April 24, 1981
June 1983	NC2000	Toshiba Machine	9	4	Baltic Shipyard	Screw	April 24, 1981
April 1984	NC2000	Toshiba Machine	5	5	Baltic Shipyard	Screw	April 1, 1983
April 1984	NC2000	Toshiba Machine	5	6	Baltic Shipyard	Screw	April 1, 1983
May 1984	NC2000	Toshiba Machine	5	7	Baltic Shipyard	Screw	April 1, 1983
May 1984	NC2000	Toshiba Machine	5	8	Baltic Shipyard	Screw	April 1, 1983

== MBP110 performance ==
- Number of axes: Nine axes
- Height: 10 m (33 ft)
- Width: 22 m (72 ft)
- Weight: 10 t
- Maximum diameter: 11 m (36 ft)
- Maximum processing weight: 130 t
- Number of maximum-feathering sheets: 11

== Shipment ==
The Soviet ship carrying the first piece of contraband departed from Tokyo Bay, passed through the North Pacific Ocean and the Bering Sea, and arrived in Leningrad via the Arctic Ocean in the spring of 1983. The other items landed at the Black Sea Port of Chornomorsk and were shipped to Leningrad by rail. Kumagai was charged with installing two machines in the propeller factory of Leningrad's Baltic Shipyard; the two remaining sets arrived later. Kumagai delivered two sets at the end of December 1983, and installed two five-axis machine tools in December 1984.

=== Dismissal ===
Wako refused to promote Kumagai, who resigned in 1985. He told Wako about the illegal exports after working with communist countries for 22 years and living in Moscow for ten. Soviet officials contacted him several times, inviting him to become a business partner. Although Wako and Toshiba Machine proposed that Kumagai disclose his knowledge of the illegal exports, he refused. The CIA knew about the illegal exports, but did not grasp the scope of the violation. KGB major Stanislav Levchenko defected to the United States in October 1979, and provided the names of about 200 Japanese agents who had been used by the KGB.

== Whistleblowing ==
Kumagai unsuccessfully attempted to report what he knew to the Tokyo Metropolitan Police Department, but officials sided with the corporations. He then wrote a December 1985 letter in English to CoCom headquarters in Paris, outlining which products had violated the regulations and details of what had been exported (or were likely to be exported) to the Soviet Union. Kumagai attached documentation of the nine-axis machine tools, and included his contact information. Concerned about a possible assassination attempt, he recorded in detail what he knew about the Soviet Union in the spring of 1986 and gave his friend a copy for safekeeping. Kumagai told his friend that if anything happened to him, he should pass the information on to the address on the letter.

=== CoCom and Japan ===
The CoCom agreement corresponded to the Foreign Exchange and Foreign Trade Control Law in Japan. CoCom showed the government of Japan Kumagai's whistleblowing, and demanded correspondence at the end of December 1985. The Japanese Ministry of Foreign Affairs, Ministry of International Trade and Industry, Ministry of the Treasury, the National Police Agency, and the Ministry of Defense met in January 1986. The government of Japan, Itochu, Toshiba and their associated companies denied Kumagai's whistleblowing until 1987. He went to the Embassy of the United States in Tokyo by summer 1986. Although the United States discussed the affair with the government of Japan 40 times by 1987, the Japanese government did not tell the United States the truth.

== Disclosure ==
On January 26–27, 1987, the United States asked Norway and Japan about the nine-axis machine tool. Norway investigated the incident, revealing Japan's crime. Kumagai contacted the government of Japan in December 1985, and received a reply on April 27, 1987.

News of the nine-axis violation in Japan appeared for the first time on April 30; news about the five-axis violation appeared in Japan for the first time on June 18. The statute of limitations on both violations had expired. The government of Japan knew the details by the end of December 1985, and allowed the statute of limitations to lapse. The Japanese government conferred with William C. Triplett, a former CIA analyst, in the Japanese Ministry of Foreign Affairs in July 1987. Triplett asked Kumagai to testify at a United States congressional hearing, but he refused. Fearing KGB retaliation, he published a book on January 30, 1988.

== Books ==
=== Nonfiction ===
- Mosukuwa yo, saraba: Kokomu ihan jiken no haikei (Goodbye, Moscow: The Background of the Toshiba–Kongsberg Scandal, モスクワよ、さらば―ココム違反事件の背景, Bungeishunjū, January 30, 1988), ISBN 978-4-16-342060-8.

=== Fiction ===
- Saigo no tobosha (最後の逃亡者, November 1993), 978-4-16-314360-6. It won the 1993 Suntory Mystery Award.
- Hikyo kara no kyohakusya (秘境からの脅迫者, October 1995), 978-4-16-640040-9.
- Saigo no tobosha (最後の逃亡者, January 1997), 978-4-16-730303-7.
- Erumitaju no nezumi (エルミタージュの鼠, July 1997), 978-4-10-602750-5.
- Roshia mokushiroku (ロシア黙示録, July 2002), 978-4-16-320250-1.
- Oomichi syonen monokatari (尾道少年物語, August 2008), 978-4-16-319460-8.

== See also ==
- Cavitation
- Sonar
- SOSUS
- John Anthony Walker
