= KG-84 =

Encryption device

KG-84A and KG-84C. US Navy photo.

The KG-84A and KG-84C are encryption devices developed by the U.S. National Security Agency (NSA) to ensure secure transmission of digital data. The KG-84C is a Dedicated Loop Encryption Device (DLED), and both devices are General-Purpose Telegraph Encryption Equipment (GPTEE). The KG-84A is primarily used for point-to-point encrypted communications via landline, microwave, and satellite systems. The KG-84C is an outgrowth of the U.S. Navy high frequency (HF) communications program and supports these needs. The KG-84A and KG-84C are devices that operate in simplex, half-duplex, or full-duplex modes. The KG-84C contains all of the KG-84 and KG-84A modes, plus a variable update counter, improved HF performance, synchronous out-of-sync detection, asynchronous cipher text, plain text, bypass, and European TELEX protocol. The KG-84 (A/C) is certified to handle data at all levels of security. The KG-84 (A/C) is a Controlled Cryptographic Item (CCI) and is unclassified when unkeyed. Keyed KG-84 equipment assumes the classification level equal to that of the keying material used.

== Characteristics ==
=== KG-84 A/C physical characteristics ===
- Height 7.8 in (198 mm)
- Width 7.5 in (191 mm)
- Depth 15 in (381 mm)
- Weight 23 lb (10 kg)

=== Data rate ===
- KG-84A 256 kbit/s synchronous and 9.6 kbit/s asynchronous
- KG-84C Up to 64 kbit/s synchronous and 9.6 kbit/s asynchronous

=== Power ===
- 24 V DC, 15 W
- 115 V AC
- 220 V AC

=== Operating temperature ===
Operating temperature: 0 to 55 °C

=== MTBF ===
69,000 hours (7.9 years)

== See also ==
- NSA encryption systems
