= Communications officer =

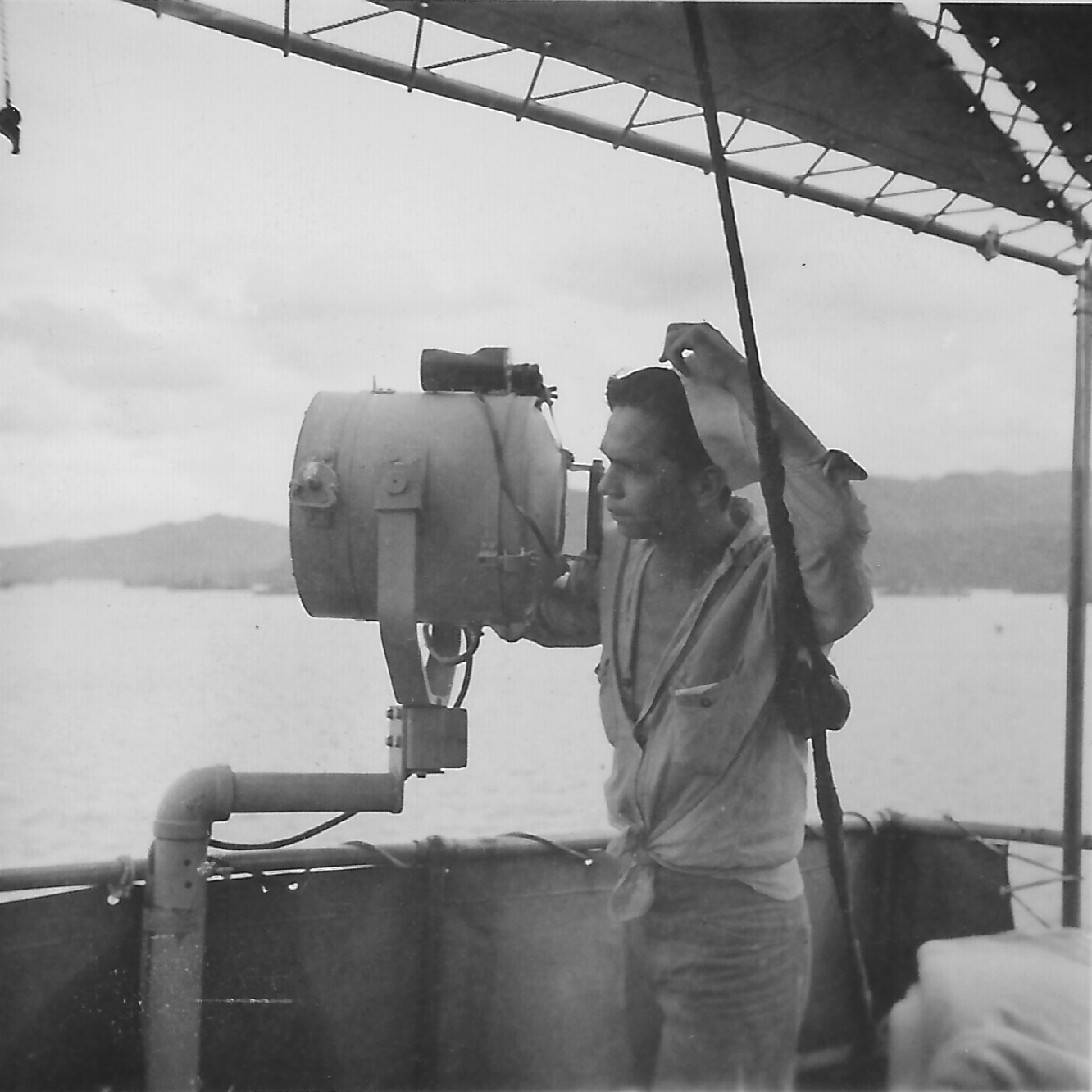
Signal lamps are one of the warship communications systems supervised by the communications officer

A communications officer is a naval line officer responsible for supervising operation and maintenance of a warship's signal flags, signal lamps, and radio transmitters and receivers. The communications officer is usually responsible for encrypting and decrypting secret message traffic and for distribution and safe storage of secret messages. Aboard some ships, the communications officer is responsible for the ship's secret publications inventory or for the ship's post office and distribution of mail.

== United States Navy ==
In the United States Navy, communications officers are referred to as a COMMO.

== Royal Canadian Navy ==
In the Royal Canadian Navy, this role is filled by the Communication and Information Systems Officer (CISO). This is a trained Naval Warfare Officer (NWO) who fulfils three roles at sea: Bridge Watchkeeper, divisional officer for the Naval Communicators, and custodian of the cryptographic keying material (COMSEC). CISOs will generally have 3–5 years' experience at sea as watchkeepers, as well as a 4–5 month course focusing on communications systems equipment, policy, and procedure.
