= Jefferson disk =

Cipher system attributed to Thomas Jefferson

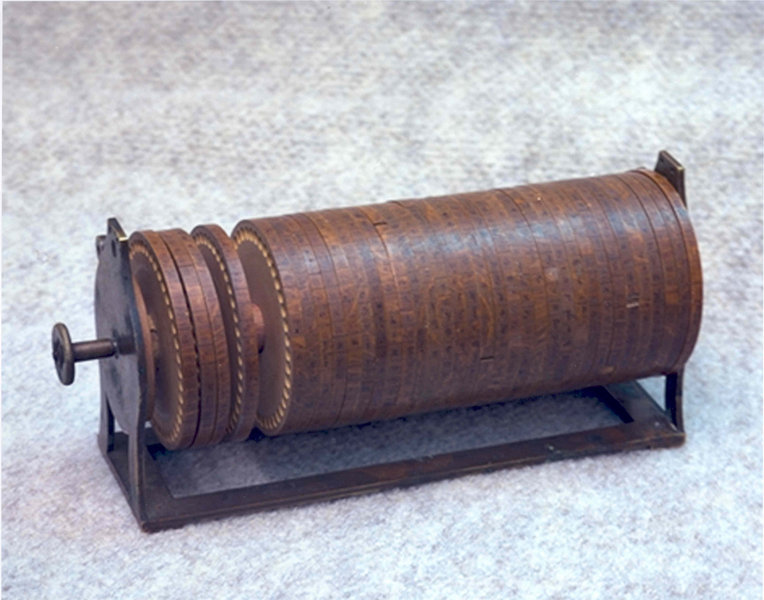
A disk cipher device of the Jefferson type from the 2nd quarter of the 19th century in the National Cryptologic Museum

The Jefferson disk, also called the Bazeries cylinder or wheel cypher, is a cipher system commonly attributed to Thomas Jefferson that uses a set of wheels or disks, each with letters of the alphabet arranged around their edge in an order, which is different for each disk and is usually ordered randomly.

Each disk is marked with a unique number, and a hole in the center of the disks allows them to be stacked on an axle. The disks are removable and can be mounted on the axle in any order desired. The order of the disks is the cipher key, and both sender and receiver must arrange the disks in the same predefined order. Jefferson's device had 36 disks while Bazeries' system had 20.

Once the disks have been placed on the axle in the agreed order, the sender rotates each disk up and down until a desired message is spelled out in one row. Then, the sender can copy down any row of text on the disks other than the one that contains the plaintext message. The recipient has to arrange the disks in the agreed-upon order, rotate the disks so they spell out the encrypted message on one row, and then look around the rows until they see the plaintext.

== History ==
In the late 18th century combination locks, known in Europe since 15th century, were popularized by Edmé Régnier L'Aîné, and versions of them with letters have been suggested to be the origin of cipher machines.

The first prototype resembling the Jefferson disk was invented by Swedish baron Fredrik Gripenstierna in 1786, but it operated on a different principle: rather than substitute letters with letters, it used 57 disks to substitute letters entered by a cleared official on the one side of device with numbers on the other side of device visible to a clerk.

At some point in the 1790s (exact date is not clear) Thomas Jefferson described the device now named after him, with 26 letters on a wheel and estimated 36 to 48 wheels, and its operation in a manuscript. It's commonly claimed that he invented it himself but it is not backed by any evidence, and Jefferson himself didn't imply so in the text. The manuscript was apparently forgotten until it was discovered in 1922 (a year after M-94 entered service, see below) by historian Edmund C. Burnett studying the Continental Congress. It doesn't appear that the device was ever fabricated, and Jefferson abandoned the idea after receiving a description of columnar transposition cipher from Robert Patterson in 1803, which he found more practical.

In the early 1980s NSA acquired for its museum a large incomplete device of Jefferson's type (picture 1 of this article) with 35 remnant disks (out of 40 originally) and 42 characters, including French letters, on each. It was dated to the second quarter of the 19th century and it's not clear if it is related to Jefferson despite originating from West Virginia.

When in 1854 Bristol dentist John H. B. Thwaites submitted a "new" cipher (which was in fact just a variant of the Vigenère cipher) to the Journal of the Society of the Arts, Charles Babbage mentioned in his response that he likes to use "rings of box-wood placed side by side on a cylinder, and having the twenty-six letters on the circumference of each". However, it's not clear from this description whether the letters were in alphabetic or random order.

=== Basis for later military ciphers ===
A device mechanically similar to Jefferson's but somewhat improved was independently re-invented in 1891 by Commandant Etienne Bazeries, but did not become well known until he broke the Great Cipher, of Rossignols. In 1893, French mathematician Arthur Joseph Hermann (better known for founding Éditions Hermann) redesigned the device to use 18 flat wooden or cardboard strips. Cryptologists in other countries also considered similar devices.

The Bazeries cylinder was the basis for the U.S. M-94 cipher machine, which was introduced in 1922 and remained in service until 1942. In 1914, Parker Hitt experimented with the Bazeries device, building one prototype using slides on a wooden frame, with the cipher alphabets printed twice consecutively on the slides, and then another using disks of wood. He forwarded his experiments up the Signal Corps chain of command, and in 1917 Joseph Mauborgne refined the scheme, with the final result being the M-94.

The M-94 used 25 aluminium disks on a spindle. It was used by the Army, Coast Guard, and the Radio Intelligence Division of the Federal Communications Commission until early in World War II. The Army changed back to Hitt's original slide scheme with the "M-138A" cipher machine, which was introduced in the 1930s and was used by the US Navy and US State Department through World War II. The M-138A featured 100 strips, with 30 selected for use in any one cipher session. It was an improvement in security for the State Department, which during the interwar years had used insecure codes, even in one case a standard commercial telegraph code.

== Example of operation ==
To encrypt a message, the encrypter rotates the disks to produce the plaintext message along one "row" of the stack of disks, and then selects another row as the ciphertext. To decrypt the message, the decrypter rotates the disks on his cylinder to produce the ciphertext along a row. Decryption is easier if both the encrypter and the decrypter know the offset of the row, but not necessary since the decrypter can look around the cylinder to find a row that makes sense.

For example, a simplified "toy" Bazeries cylinder using only ten disks might be organized as shown below, with each disk "unwrapped" into a line and each marked with a designating number:

1:	< ZWAXJGDLUBVIQHKYPNTCRMOSFE <
2:	< KPBELNACZDTRXMJQOYHGVSFUWI <
3:	< BDMAIZVRNSJUWFHTEQGYXPLOCK <
4:	< RPLNDVHGFCUKTEBSXQYIZMJWAO <
5:	< IHFRLABEUOTSGJVDKCPMNZQWXY <
6:	< AMKGHIWPNYCJBFZDRUSLOQXVET <
7:	< GWTHSPYBXIZULVKMRAFDCEONJQ <
8:	< NOZUTWDCVRJLXKISEFAPMYGHBQ <
9:	< XPLTDSRFHENYVUBMCQWAOIKZGJ <
10:	< UDNAJFBOWTGVRSCZQKELMXYIHP <

If the "key", the sequence of disks, for this Bazeries cylinder is 7, 9, 5, 10, 1, 6, 3, 8, 2, 4 and the encrypter wants to send the message "retreat now" to the decrypter, the encrypter rearranges the disks as per the key and rotates each disk to obtain the plaintext, which is shown at the left, with spacing added for clarity:

7:	< R AFDCE O NJQGWTHSPYBXIZULVKM <
9:	< E NYVUB M CQWAOIKZGJXPLTDSRFH <
5:	< T SGJVD K CPMNZQWXYIHFRLABEUO <
10:	< R SCZQK E LMXYIHPUDNAJFBOWTGV <
1:	< E ZWAXJ G DLUBVIQHKYPNTCRMOSF <
6:	< A MKGHI W PNYCJBFZDRUSLOQXVET <
3:	< T EQGYX P LOCKBDMAIZVRNSJUWFH <
8:	< N OZUTW D CVRJLXKISEFAPMYGHBQ <
2:	< O YHGVS F UWIKPBELNACZDTRXMJQ <
4:	< W AORPL N DVHGFCUKTEBSXQYIZMJ <

The encrypter then selects the ciphertext from the sixth row of the cylinder up from the plaintext. This ciphertext is also highlighted above with spacing, and gives: OMKEGWPDFN. When the decrypter gets the ciphertext, they rearrange the disks on their cylinder to the key arrangement, rotate the disks to give the ciphertext, and then read the plaintext six rows down from the ciphertext, or look over the cylinder for a row that makes sense.

== Cryptanalysis ==
The Bazeries cylinder was a relatively strong system at the time (compared to many other systems in use), and Etienne Bazeries, a French military cryptanalyst, is said to have regarded it as indecipherable. The "Pers Z S" code-breaking group of the German Foreign Office cracked the M-138-A in 1944. However, by that time the Americans had more sophisticated cipher systems in operation.

The French cryptographer Gaetan de Viaris (a.k.a. Marquis Gaetan Henri Leon Viarizio di Lesegno), who is famous for one of the first printing cipher devices (1874), solved the Bazeries cylinder in 1893.

One major weakness of the Bazeries cylinder is that the offset from the plaintext letter to the ciphertext letter for the cipher alphabet on each disk will be exactly the same. In the example shown above, this offset is six letters.

For example, if a cryptanalyst found a message encrypted on the ten-disk Bazeries cylinder described in the example above and has captured their own cylinder, they could decipher the message by entering it on their cylinder and rotating it until they found the message. Still, the number of possible permutations of the disks of the example Bazeries cylinder is 10! = 3,628,800. Due to the large size of this number, trial and error testing of the arrangement of the disks is difficult to perform by hand.

== Sources ==
- Friedman, William F. (1918). Several Machine Ciphers and Methods for their Solution (PDF). Methods for the Solution of Ciphers, Publications 15–22. Riverbank Publications. PDF p. 225. Archived (PDF) from the original on 2022-02-11 – via Rufus A. Long Digital Library of Cryptography.
- Kahn, David (1967). The Codebreakers. pp. 192–195.
