= Frank Miller (disambiguation) =

Frank Miller (born 1957) is an American comics writer, artist, and film director.

Frank Miller may also refer to:

== Arts and entertainment ==
- Frank Miller (screenwriter) (1891–1950), British writer, director, actor
- Frank Miller (newspaper cartoonist) (1898–1949), newspaper comic strip creator
- Frank Miller (cellist) (1912–1986), cellist with NBC Symphony Orchestra
- Frank Miller (singer) (1918–2015), pop singer with The Easy Riders
- Frank Miller (editorial cartoonist) (1926–1983), editorial cartoonist
- Frank Miller (actor) (1944–1998), American actor

== Military ==
- Frank Miller (Medal of Honor) (1848–1903), American Civil War soldier and Medal of Honor recipient
- Frank Robert Miller (1908–1997), Canadian military aviator, Canada's last chairman of the Chiefs of Staff and first chief of the Defence Staff, and deputy minister of National Defence
- An alias used by Frances Hook (1847–1908) while serving in the American Civil War

== Sports ==
- Frank Miller (infielder) (1867–1942), American baseball player
- Frank Miller (South African cricketer) (1880–1958), South African cricketer
- Frank Miller (pitcher) (1886–1974), Major League Baseball player
- Frank Miller (Irish cricketer) (1916–2000), Irish cricketer

== Others ==
- Frank Miller (cryptographer) (1842–1925), American banker and cryptographer
- Frank Miller (Kentucky politician) (1936–1994), member of the Kentucky Senate
- Frank Miller (Canadian politician) (1927–2000), 19th premier of Ontario, who came to power in 1985
- Frank A. Miller (Brooklyn) (1888–1931), New York politician
- Frank Augustus Miller (1858–1935), founder of the Mission Inn in Riverside, California
- Frank Justus Miller (1858–1938), American classical scholar and translator
- Frank P. Miller (1912–2000), helped to create the modern parole system in Canada
- Frank Stuart Miller (1927–2000), Canadian politician and Premier of Ontario
- An alias used by Joseph James Bruno (c. 1878–1951) while escaped from prison

== Characters ==
- Frank Miller, the name of the antagonist in the 1952 western film High Noon
- Frank Miller, the name of Junie B. Jones's maternal grandfather in the popular children's book series
- Frank Miller, the name of a bank robber in Elmore Leonard's short story "Showdown at Checotah"

== See also ==
- Franklin Miller (disambiguation)
- Frank Millar (disambiguation)
- Frankie Miller (born 1949), Scottish musician
- Frankie Miller (country musician) (born 1931), American country musician
- Francis Miller (disambiguation)
