= Franklin Miller (disambiguation) =

Franklin Miller is a US government official.

Franklin Miller may also refer to:

- Franklin D. Miller (1945–2000), United States Army soldier and Medal of Honor recipient
- Franklin Clark Miller (1938–2008), American football player
- Franklin G. Miller (born 1948), American bioethicist
- Franklin F. Miller, politician in South Carolina
- Franklin Miller Inc., American size reduction technology producer
- Franklin Miller, Jr. (1912–2012), American physicist, educator, and textbook author

== See also ==
- Frank Miller (disambiguation)
- Al Millar (Franklin Allan Millar, 1929–1987), Canadian ice hockey goaltender
