= Frank Millar =

Frank Millar may refer to:

- Frank Millar (politician, born 1925) (1925–2001), Northern Irish unionist politician
- Frank Millar Jr, his son, journalist and former politician
- Frank Winfird Millar (1885–1944), New Zealand public servant and union official

== See also ==
- Frank Miller (disambiguation)
- Al Millar (Franklin Allan Millar, 1929–1987), Canadian ice hockey goaltender
