= M-94 (cipher machine) =

US cryptographic equipment

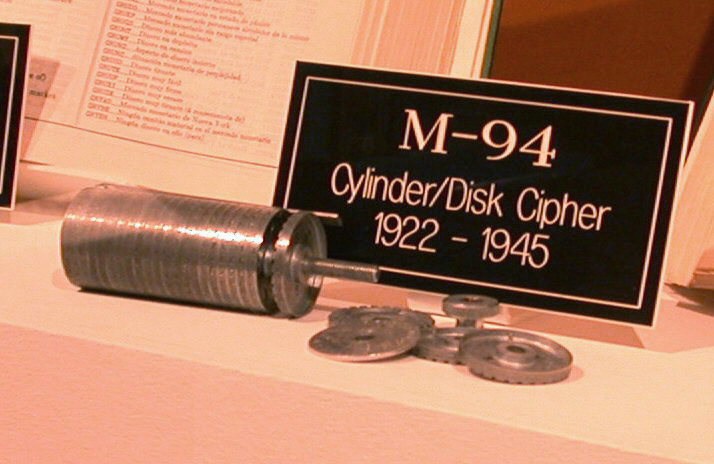
The M-94 at the National Cryptologic Museum

The M-94 was a piece of cryptographic equipment used by the United States Army, consisting of several lettered discs arranged as a cylinder. It was also employed by the US Navy, under the name CSP 488.

The device was conceived by Colonel Parker Hitt and then developed by Major Joseph Mauborgne in 1917; based on a system invented by Thomas Jefferson and Etienne Bazeries. Officially adopted in 1922, it remained in use until circa 1942, when it was replaced by more complex and secure electromechanical rotor machines, particularly the M-209.

== Principle ==
The device consisted of 25 aluminium discs attached to a four-and-a-half inch long rod, each disc containing the 26 letters of the Roman alphabet in scrambled order around its circumference (with the exception of the 17th disc, which began with the letters "ARMY OF THE US"). Each wheel had a different arrangement of the alphabet, and was stamped with an identifying number and letter; wheels were identified according to the letter following "A" on that wheel, from "B 1" to "Z 25". The wheels could be assembled on the rod in any order; the ordering used during encoding comprised the key. There were 25! (25 factorial) = 15,511,210,043,330,985,984,000,000 (more than 15 septillion) possible keys, which can be expressed as about an 84-bit key size.

Messages were encrypted 25 letters at a time. Turning the discs individually, the operator aligned the letters in the message horizontally. Then, any one of the remaining lines around the circumference of the cylinder was sent as the ciphertext. To decrypt, the wheels were turned until one line matched a 25 letter block of ciphertext. The plaintext would then appear on one of the other lines, which could be visually located easily, as it would be the only one likely to "read."

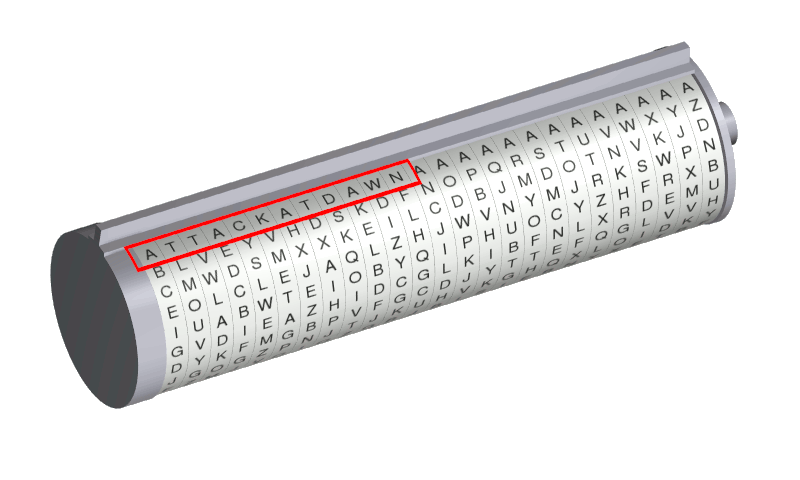
A wheel cipher being used to encode the phrase "ATTACK AT DAWN." One possible ciphertext is "CMWD SMXX KEIL."

The principle upon which the M-94/CSP-488 is based was first invented by Thomas Jefferson in 1795 in his "wheel cypher" but did not become well known, and was independently invented by Etienne Bazeries a century later.

== M-138-A ==
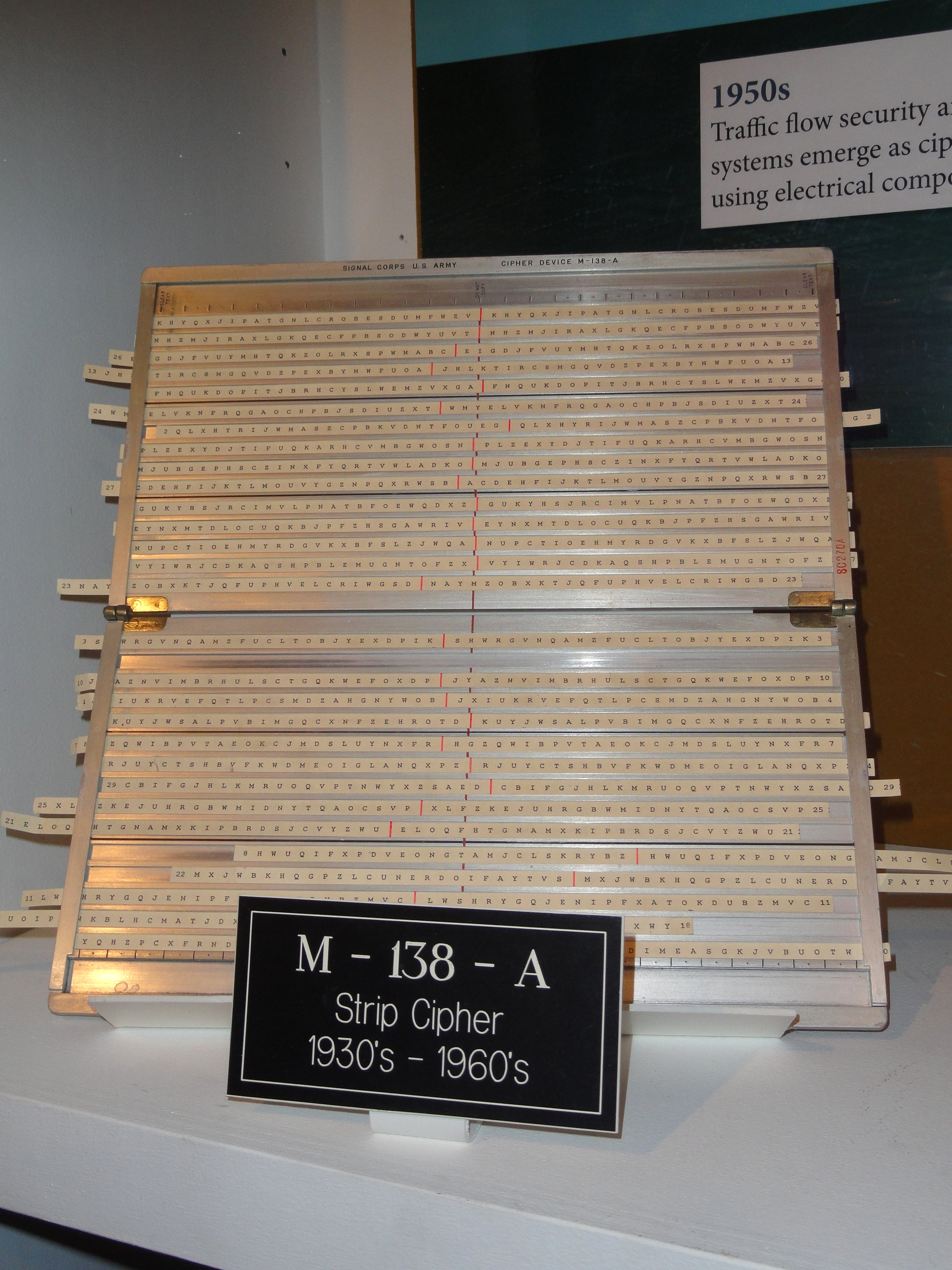
An M-138-A at the National Cryptologic Museum"

In an extension of the same general principle, the M-138-A strip cipher machine, used by the US Army, Navy (as CSP-845), Coast Guard and State Department through World War II, featured hundreds of flat cardboard strips. Each strip contained a scrambled alphabet, repeated twice, that could be slid back and forth in a frame; with 30 being selected for each cipher session. The strip cipher could interoperate with the M-94 if suitable strips were provided.

The original design used an aluminum base. William F. Friedman describes the problem of getting them manufactured and how it was overcome:

"It soon became apparent to both Army and Navy cryptologists that a great increase in cryptosecurity would be obtained if the alphabets of the M-94 device could be made variant instead of invariant. There began efforts in both services to develop a practical instrument based upon this principle. I won't take time to show all these developments but only the final form of the one adopted by the Army, Strip Cipher Device Type, M-138-A. This form used an aluminum base into which channels with overhanging edges were cut to hold cardboard strips of alphabets which could be slid easily within the channels. It may be of interest to you to learn that after I had given up in my attempts to find a firm which would or could make such aluminum grooved devices in quantity, Mrs. Friedman, by womanly wiles and cajolery on behalf of her own group in the U.S. Coast Guard, succeeded in inducing or enticing one firm to make them for her. And it's how the first models of strip cipher devices made of aluminum by the extrusion process came about, and how the U.S. Army, by administrative cooperation on an inter-Service level and technical cooperation on a marital level, found it practical to develop and produce in quantity its Strip Cipher Device, Type M-138-A. This was used from 1935 to 1941 or 1942 by the Army, the Navy, the Marine Corps, the Coast Guard, et al, including the Treasury and State Departments. It was used as a back-up system even after the Armed Services as well as the Department of State began employing much better and more sophisticated cipher machines of high speed and security."

Another problem was that aluminum was in short supply early in the war and attempts were made to make the strip cipher bases out of plastic or mahogany, with limited success. Fortunately, aluminum became available again for this use in the fall of 1943.

Besides the military, Department of State and many other civilian agencies (like OSS) were using it for most important messages, and despite it being a powerful method in theory, made many mistakes so the system was compromised, letting multiple Axis countries decipher it.

== Cryptanalysis ==
Like most classical ciphers, strip ciphers can be easily cracked if there is enough intercepted ciphertext. However, this takes time and specialized skills, so the M-94 was still good enough during the early years of World War II for its intended use as a "tactical cipher"; in a similar way to the more modern DRYAD and BATCO. The M-138-A was stronger because slips with new alphabets could be issued periodically, even by radio using more secure systems like SIGABA, however this was not practiced until the US found out that their strips were compromised in early 1943. Both were replaced by the M-209 mechanical rotor machine as these became available.

The main method of M-138-A cryptanalysis practiced by Axis, besides physically capturing the systems, was exploiting its vulnerability to the known-plaintext attack (e. g., when the same text was published in press releases), as well as to failure of embassies to get updated keys and strips.

== See also ==
- Jefferson disk
- One time pad
