= Mk 123 =

The Mk. 123 (Mark 123) is a British compact, valve-based clandestine radio transceiver/transmitter-receiver set designed during the Cold War as a post-WW2 replacement for older radio sets like the Type 3 Mk. II (B2).

== Usage ==
During the turmoil of the Iranian Revolution (including the period surrounding the seizure of the US Embassy and local communication cutoffs), a British Embassy technician used an off-site hidden Mk.123 transceiver to transmit emergency One-time pad (OTP) Morse code messages out of the country such as to relay points in Australia or Darwin.
