= Frank Miller (cryptographer) =

(1842–1925) American cryptographer, banker, and trustee of Stanford University

Franklin Miller
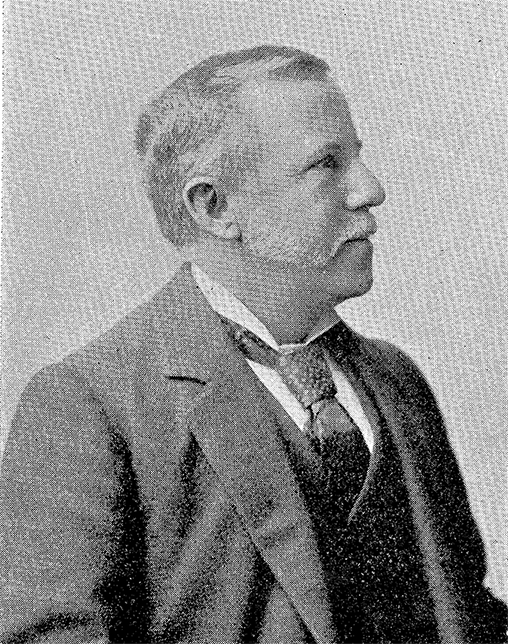
- Born: January 19, 1842; Milwaukee, Wisconsin, United States
- Died: February 13, 1925 (aged 83); Berkeley, California, United States
- Education: Yale University
- Known for: Invention of the one-time pad
- Spouse: Sarah Ednah Pierce (m. 1867; died 1886) Elinor Cecilia Cook (m. 1888)
- Children: 7

Franklin Miller (January 19, 1842 – February 13, 1925) was an American cryptographer, banker, and trustee of Stanford University. He invented the one-time pad in 1882, 35 years before the patent issued to Gilbert Vernam.

Born in Milwaukee, Wisconsin, in 1842, he graduated from Yale University and then joined the Union Army during the American Civil War, where he was wounded during the Second Battle of Bull Run.

Miller's goal with ciphering was to save money by compressing telegraph messages. His telegraph code used code groups of 5-digits representing words and phrases common in commercial telegrams. His cipher added a number with 3 digits to each of the 5-digit groups. In 1882, Miller published a code-book with corresponding numbers for 14,000 terms and parts of sentences, encouraging users to use so-called shift-numbers (3-digit codes) for extra-encryption in case particularly sensitive information is being transmitted.
