= Noreen (cipher machine) =

Cipher machine

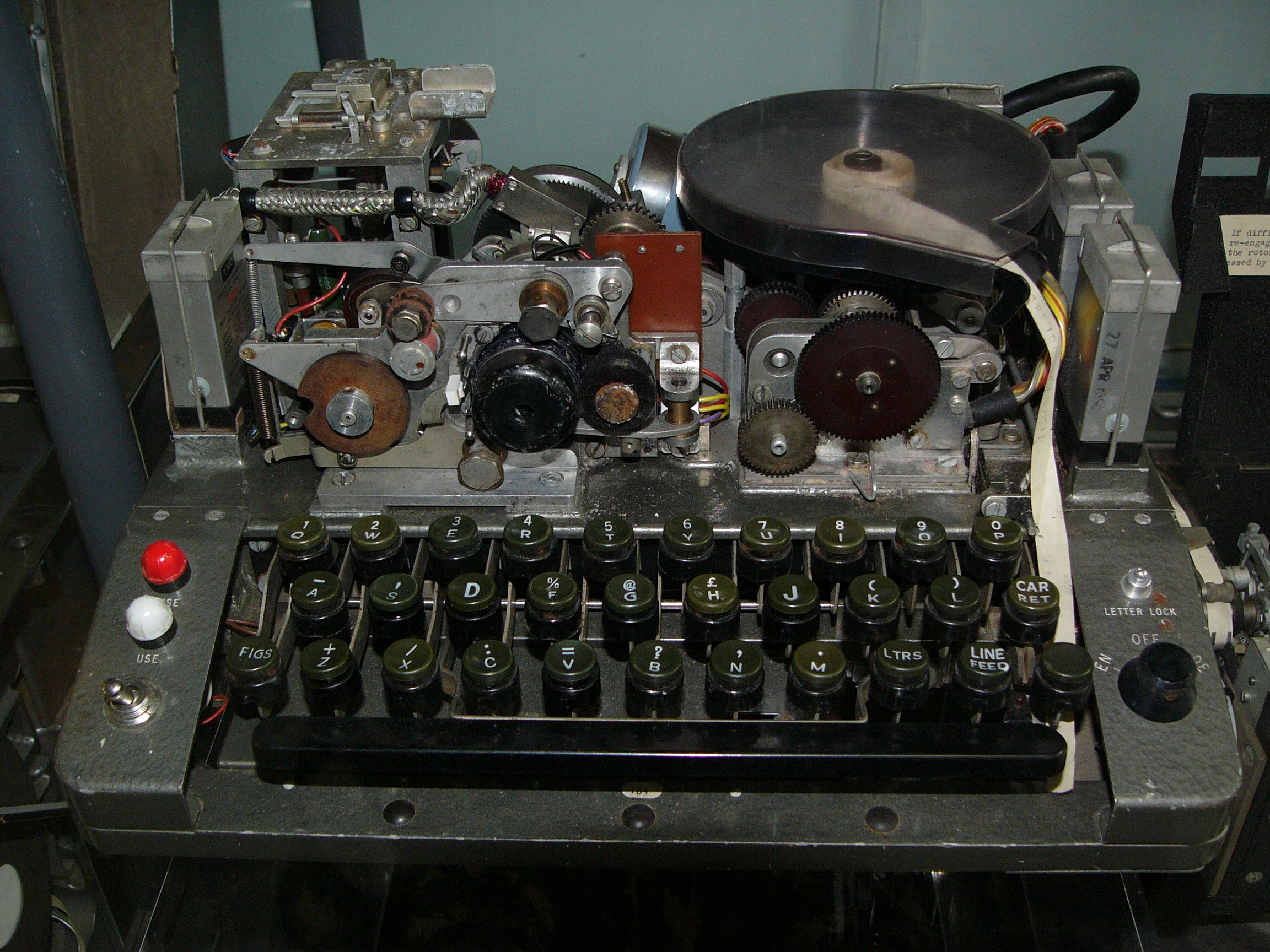
Noreen on display at Bletchley Park museum

Noreen, or BID 590, was an off-line one-time tape cipher machine of British origin.

== Usage ==
As well as being used by the United Kingdom, Noreen was used by Canada. It was widely used in diplomatic stations. According to the display note on a surviving unit publicly displayed at Bletchley Park in the United Kingdom, the system was predominantly used "by the foreign office in British embassies overseas where the electricity supply was unreliable."

Usage lasted from the mid-1960s through 1990.

== Compatibility ==
It was completely compatible with Rockex.

== Power supply ==
The units were powered by two batteries of six and twelve volts respectively, though some were known to have been powered by mains.
