= Francis Miller =

Francis Miller may refer to:

- Francis Norie-Miller (1859–1947), British insurance company manager and later Liberal National politician
- Francis Pickens Miller (1895–1978), American military and intelligence officer and Virginia politician
- Francis Trevelyan Miller (1877–1959), American writer and film-maker
- Francis Spurstow Miller (1863–1954), Royal Navy officer
- Francis T. Miller, American farmer and politician from New York
- F. Russell Miller, New Zealand politician
- Robert Francis Miller, Canadian politician

== See also ==
- Frank Miller (disambiguation)
