= Silence Dogood =

Pen name

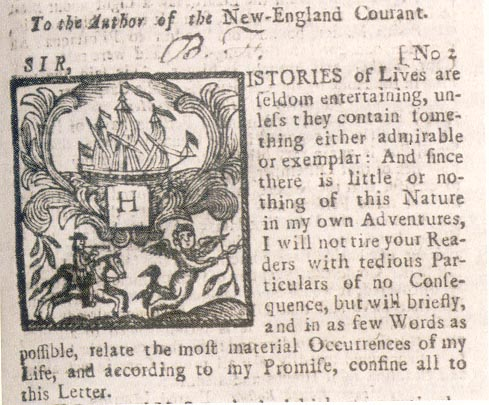
Silence Dogood Essay in the New-England Courant

Silence Dogood was the pen name used by Benjamin Franklin to get his work published in the New-England Courant, a newspaper founded and published by his brother James Franklin. This was after Benjamin Franklin was denied several times when he tried to publish letters under his own name in the Courant. The 14 Mrs. Silence Dogood letters were first printed in 1722.

== History ==
As a young boy, Franklin worked as an apprentice in his older brother's printing shop in Boston, where The New-England Courant was published and printed.

Franklin never got anything he wrote published, so, at age 16, he created the persona of a middle-aged widow named Silence Dogood. Once every two weeks, he would leave a letter under the door of his brother's printing shop. A total of 14 letters were sent. The first letter began:

Sir,

It may not be possible in the first Place to inform your Readers, that I intend once a Fortnight to present them, by the Help of this Paper, with a short Epistle, which I presume will add somewhat to their Entertainment.

And since it is observed, that the Generality of People, nowadays, are unwilling either to commend or dispraise what they read, until they are in some measure informed who or what the Author of it is, whether he be poor or rich, old or young, a Schollar or a Leather Apron Man, &c. and give their Opinion of the Performance, according to the Knowledge which they have of the Author's Circumstances, it may not be amiss to begin with a short Account of my past Life and present Condition, that the Reader may not be at a Loss to judge whether or no my Lucubrations are worth his reading.

The letters poked fun at various aspects of life in colonial America, such as this quote about hoop petticoats:

These monstrous topsy-turvy Mortar-Pieces, are neither fit for the Church, the Hall, or the Kitchen; and if a Number of them were well mounted on Noddles-Island, they would look more like Engines of War for bombarding the Town, than Ornaments of the Fair Sex. An honest Neighbour of mine, happening to be in Town some time since on a publick Day, inform'd me, that he saw four Gentlewomen with their Hoops half mounted in a Balcony, as they withdrew to the Wall, to the great Terror of the Militia, who (he thinks) might attribute their irregular Volleys to the formidable Appearance of the Ladies Petticoats.

The letters were published in The New-England Courant fortnightly, and amused readers. Some men wrote in offering to marry Ms. Dogood, upon learning she was widowed.

Eventually, James found out that all fourteen of the letters had been written by his younger brother, which angered him. Benjamin left his apprenticeship without permission and escaped to Philadelphia.

== Letters 1 and 2 – Dogood's background ==
Franklin created a whole background for his character, and explained this in depth in the majority of his first letter:

At the time of my Birth, my Parents were on Ship-board in their Way from London to N. England. My Entrance into this troublesome World was attended with the Death of my Father, a Misfortune, which tho' I was not then capable of knowing, I shall never be able to forget; for as he, poor Man, stood upon the Deck rejoycing at my Birth, a merciless Wave entered the Ship, and in one Moment carry'd him beyond Reprieve. Thus was the first Day which I saw, the last that was seen by my Father; and thus was my disconsolate Mother at once made both a Parent and a Widow.

When we arrived at Boston (which was not long after) I was put to Nurse in a Country Place, at a small Distance from the Town, where I went to School, and past my Infancy and Childhood in Vanity and Idleness, until I was bound out Apprentice, that I might no longer be a Charge to my Indigent Mother, who was put to hard Shifts for a Living.

My Master was a Country Minister, a pious good-natur'd young Man, & a Batchelor: He labour'd with all his Might to instil vertuous and godly Principles into my tender Soul, well knowing that it was the most suitable Time to make deep and lasting Impressions on the Mind, while it was yet untainted with Vice, free and unbiass'd. He endeavour'd that I might be instructed in all that Knowledge and Learning which is necessary for our Sex, and deny'd me no Accomplishment that could possibly be attained in a Country Place; such as all Sorts of Needle-Work, Writing, Arithmetick, &c. and observing that I took a more than ordinary Delight in reading ingenious Books, he gave me the free Use of his Library, which tho' it was but small, yet it was well chose, to inform the Understanding rightly, and enable the Mind to frame great and noble Ideas.

Before I had liv'd quite two Years with this Reverend Gentleman, my indulgent Mother departed this Life, leaving me as it were by my self, having no Relation on Earth within my Knowledge.

I will not abuse your Patience with a tedious Recital of all the frivolous Accidents of my Life, that happened from this Time until I arrived to Years of Discretion, only inform you that I liv'd a chearful Country Life, spending my leisure Time either in some innocent Diversion with the neighbouring Females, or in some shady Retirement, with the best of Company, Books. Thus I past away the Time with a Mixture of Profit and Pleasure, having no Affliction but what was imaginary, and created in my own Fancy; as nothing is more common with us Women, than to be grieving for nothing, when we have nothing else to grieve for.

The whole second letter was an account of Dogood's life:

Histories of Lives are seldom entertaining, unless they contain something either admirable or exemplar: And since there is little or nothing of this Nature in my own Adventures, I will not tire your Readers with tedious Particulars of no Consequence, but will briefly, and in as few Words as possible, relate the most material Occurrences of my Life, and according to my Promise, confine all to this Letter.

My Reverend master who had hitherto remained a Bachelor, (after much meditation on the Eighteenth verse of the Second Chapter of Genesis,) took up a Resolution to marry; and having made several unsuccessful fruitless Attempts on the more topping Sort of our Sex, and being tired with making troublesome Journeys and Visits to no Purpose, he began unexpectedly to cast a loving Eye upon Me, whom he had brought up cleverly to his Hand. There is certainly scarce any Part of a Man's Life in which he appears more silly and ridiculous, than when he makes his first Onset in Courtship. The awkward Manner in which my Master first discovered his Intentions, made me, in spite of my Reverence to his Person, burst out into an unmannerly Laughter: However, having asked his Pardon, and with much ado composed my Countenance, I promised him I would take his Proposal into serious Consideration, and speedily give him an Answer. As he had been a great Benefactor (and in a Manner a Father to me) I could not well deny his Request, when I once perceived he was in earnest. Whether it was Love, or Gratitude, or Pride, or all Three that made me consent, I know not; but it is certain, he found it no hard Matter, by the Help of his Rhetoric, to conquer my Heart, and persuade me to marry him. This unexpected Match was very astonishing to all the Country round about, and served to furnish them with Discourse for a long Time after; some approving it, others disliking it, as they were led by their various Fancies and Inclinations.

I shall conclude this with my own Character, which (one would think) I should be best able to give. Know then, That I am an Enemy to Vice, and a Friend to Vertue. I am one of an extensive Charity, and a great Forgiver of private Injuries: A hearty Lover of the Clergy and all good Men, and a mortal Enemy to arbitrary Government & unlimited Power. I am naturally very jealous for the Rights and Liberties of my Country; & the least appearance of an Incroachment on those invaluable Priviledges [sic], is apt to make my Blood boil exceedingly. I have likewise a natural Inclination to observe and reprove the Faults of others, at which I have an excellent Faculty. I speak this by Way of Warning to all such whose Offences shall come under my Cognizance, for I never intend to wrap my Talent in a Napkin. To be brief; I am courteous and affable, good-humour'd (unless I am first provok'd,) and handsome, and sometimes witty...

== In popular culture ==
The Silence Dogood letters feature in the 2004 movie National Treasure. After stealing the United States Declaration of Independence, treasure hunter Benjamin Franklin Gates (Nicolas Cage), Riley Poole (Justin Bartha), and Dr. Abigail Chase (Diane Kruger) find an Ottendorf cipher hidden in invisible ink on the back of the Declaration. Following the discovery of a Knights Templar riddle, which said "The key in Silence undetected", a link between the Silence Dogood letters and the cipher is established. The cipher is used to find the hidden message in the letters, which proves to be another clue. With the help of a fellow museum visitor (Yves Michael-Beneche), Riley gains the letters of the cipher needed to complete the puzzle while remaining undetected by their enemies, led by Ian Howe (Sean Bean).
