= One-time pad =

Encryption technique

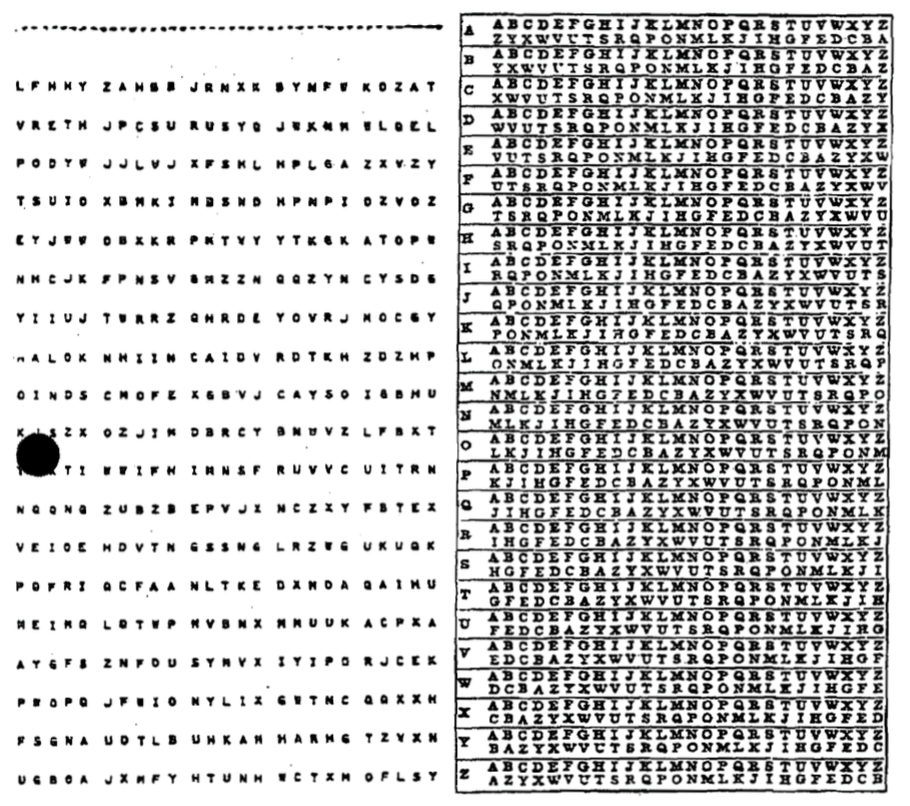
A format of one-time pad used by the U.S. National Security Agency, code named DIANA. The table on the right is an aid for converting between plaintext and ciphertext using the characters at left as the key.

The one-time pad (OTP), also known as the Vernam cipher, is an encryption technique that cannot be cracked in cryptography. It requires the use of a single-use pre-shared key that is larger than or equal to the size of the message being sent. In this technique, a plaintext is paired with a random secret key (also referred to as a one-time pad). Then, each bit or character of the plaintext is encrypted by combining it with the corresponding bit or character from the pad using modular addition.

The resulting ciphertext is impossible to decrypt or break if the following four conditions are met:

1. The key must be at least as long as the plaintext.
2. The key must be truly random.
3. The key must never be reused in whole or in part.
4. The key must be kept completely secret by the communicating parties.

These requirements make the OTP the only known encryption system that is mathematically proven to be unbreakable under the principles of information theory.

Digital versions of one-time pad ciphers have been used by nations for critical diplomatic and military communication, but the problems of secure key distribution make them impractical for many applications.

First described by Frank Miller in 1882, the one-time pad was re-invented in 1917. On July 22, 1919, U.S. Patent 1,310,719 was issued to Gilbert Vernam for the XOR operation used for the encryption of a one-time pad. One-time use came later, when Joseph Mauborgne recognized that if the key tape were totally random, then cryptanalysis would be impossible. To increase security, one-time pads were sometimes printed onto sheets of highly flammable nitrocellulose, so that they could easily be burned after use.

== History ==
Frank Miller in 1882 was the first to describe the one-time pad system for securing telegraphy.

The next one-time pad system was electrical. In 1917, Gilbert Vernam (of AT&T Corporation) invented and later patented in 1919 (U.S. patent 1,310,719) a cipher based on teleprinter technology. Each character in a message was electrically combined with a character on a punched paper tape key. Joseph Mauborgne (then a captain in the U.S. Army and later chief of the Signal Corps) recognized that the character sequence on the key tape could be completely random and that, if so, cryptanalysis would be more difficult. Together they invented the first one-time tape system.

The next development was the paper pad system. Diplomats had long used codes and ciphers for confidentiality and to minimize telegraph costs. For the codes, words and phrases were converted to groups of numbers (typically 4 or 5 digits) using a dictionary-like codebook. For added security, secret numbers could be combined with (usually modular addition) each code group before transmission, with the secret numbers being changed periodically (this was called superencryption). In the early 1920s, three German cryptographers (Werner Kunze, Rudolf Schauffler, and Erich Langlotz), who were involved in breaking such systems, realized that they could never be broken if a separate randomly chosen additive number was used for every code group. They had duplicate paper pads printed with lines of random number groups. Each page had a serial number and eight lines. Each line had six 5-digit numbers. A page would be used as a work sheet to encode a message and then destroyed. The serial number of the page would be sent with the encoded message. The recipient would reverse the procedure and then destroy his copy of the page. The German foreign office put this system into operation by 1923.

A separate notion was the use of a one-time pad of letters to encode plaintext directly as in the example below. Leo Marks describes inventing such a system for the British Special Operations Executive during World War II, though he suspected at the time that it was already known in the highly compartmentalized world of cryptography, as for instance at Bletchley Park.

The final discovery was made by information theorist Claude Shannon in the 1940s who recognized and proved the theoretical significance of the one-time pad system. Shannon delivered his results in a classified report in 1945 and published them openly in 1949. Prior to this, Soviet information theorist Vladimir Kotelnikov had independently proved the absolute security of the one-time pad; his results were delivered in 1941 in a report that apparently remains classified.

There also exists a quantum analogue of the one time pad, which can be used to exchange quantum states along a one-way quantum channel with perfect secrecy, which is sometimes used in quantum computing. It can be shown that a shared secret of at least 2n classical bits is required to exchange an n-qubit quantum state along a one-way quantum channel (by analogue with the result that a key of n bits is required to exchange an n bit message with perfect secrecy). A scheme proposed in 2000 achieves this bound. One way to implement this quantum one-time pad is by dividing the 2n bit key into n pairs of bits. To encrypt the state, for each pair of bits i in the key, one would apply an X gate to qubit i of the state if and only if the first bit of the pair is 1, and apply a Z gate to qubit i of the state if and only if the second bit of the pair is 1. Decryption involves applying this transformation again, since X and Z are their own inverses. This can be shown to be perfectly secret in a quantum setting.

== Example ==
Suppose Alice wishes to send the message hello to Bob. Assume two pads of paper containing identical random sequences of letters were somehow previously produced and securely issued to both. Alice chooses the appropriate unused page from the pad. The way to do this is normally arranged for in advance, as for instance "use the 12th sheet on 1 May", or "use the next available sheet for the next message".

The material on the selected sheet is the key for this message. Each letter from the pad will be combined in a predetermined way with one letter of the message. (It is common, but not required, to assign each letter a numerical value, e.g., a is 0, b is 1, and so on.)

In this example, the technique is to combine the key and the message using modular addition, not unlike the Vigenère cipher. The numerical values of corresponding message and key letters are added together, modulo 26. So, if key material begins with XMCKL and the message is hello, then the coding would be done as follows:

      h       e       l       l       o  message
   7 (h)   4 (e)  11 (l)  11 (l)  14 (o) message
+ 23 (X)  12 (M)   2 (C)  10 (K)  11 (L) key
= 30      16      13      21      25     message + key
=  4 (E)  16 (Q)  13 (N)  21 (V)  25 (Z) (message + key) mod 26
      E       Q       N       V       Z  → ciphertext

If a number is larger than 25, then the remainder after subtraction of 26 is taken in modular arithmetic fashion. This simply means that if the computations "go past" Z, the sequence starts again at A.

The ciphertext to be sent to Bob is thus EQNVZ. Bob uses the matching key page and the same process, but in reverse, to obtain the plaintext. Here the key is subtracted from the ciphertext, again using modular arithmetic:

       E       Q       N       V       Z  ciphertext
    4 (E)  16 (Q)  13 (N)  21 (V)  25 (Z) ciphertext
−  23 (X)  12 (M)   2 (C)  10 (K)  11 (L) key
= −19       4      11      11      14     ciphertext – key
=   7 (h)   4 (e)  11 (l)  11 (l)  14 (o) ciphertext – key (mod 26)
       h       e       l       l       o  → message

Similar to the above, if a number is negative, then 26 is added to make the number zero or higher.

Thus Bob recovers Alice's plaintext, the message hello. Both Alice and Bob destroy the key sheet immediately after use, thus preventing reuse and an attack against the cipher. The KGB often issued its agents one-time pads printed on tiny sheets of flash paper, paper chemically converted to nitrocellulose, which burns almost instantly and leaves no ash.

The classical one-time pad of espionage used actual pads of minuscule, easily concealed paper, a sharp pencil, and some mental arithmetic. The method can be implemented now as a software program, using data files as input (plaintext), output (ciphertext) and key material (the required random sequence). The exclusive or (XOR) operation is often used to combine the plaintext and the key elements, and is especially attractive on computers since it is usually a native machine instruction and is therefore very fast. It is, however, difficult to ensure that the key material is actually random, is used only once, never becomes known to the opposition, and is completely destroyed after use. The auxiliary parts of a software one-time pad implementation present real challenges: secure handling/transmission of plaintext, truly random keys, and one-time-only use of the key.

=== Attempt at cryptanalysis ===
To continue the example from above, suppose Eve intercepts Alice's ciphertext: EQNVZ. If Eve tried every possible key, she would find that the key XMCKL would produce the plaintext hello, but she would also find that the key TQURI would produce the plaintext later, an equally plausible message:

    4 (E)  16 (Q)  13 (N)  21 (V)  25 (Z) ciphertext
−  19 (T)  16 (Q)  20 (U)  17 (R)   8 (I) possible key
= −15       0      −7       4      17     ciphertext-key
=  11 (l)   0 (a)  19 (t)   4 (e)  17 (r) ciphertext-key (mod 26)

In fact, it is possible to "decrypt" out of the ciphertext any message whatsoever with the same number of characters, simply by using a different key, and there is no information in the ciphertext that will allow Eve to choose among the various possible readings of the ciphertext.

If the key is not truly random, it is possible to use statistical analysis to determine which of the plausible keys is the "least" random and therefore more likely to be the correct one. If a key is reused, it will noticeably be the only key that produces sensible plaintexts from both ciphertexts (the chances of some random incorrect key also producing two sensible plaintexts are very slim).

== Perfect secrecy ==
One-time pads are "information-theoretically secure" in that the encrypted message (i.e., the ciphertext) provides no information about the original message to a cryptanalyst (except the maximum possible length (Note: The actual length of a plaintext message can hidden by the addition of extraneous parts, called padding. For instance, a 21-character ciphertext could conceal a 5-character message with some padding convention (e.g. "-PADDING- HELLO -XYZ-") as much as an actual 21-character message: an observer can thus only deduce the maximum possible length of the significant text, not its exact length.) of the message). This is a very strong notion of security first developed during WWII by Claude Shannon and proved, mathematically, to be true for the one-time pad by Shannon at about the same time. His result was published in the Bell System Technical Journal in 1949. If properly used, one-time pads are secure in this sense even against adversaries with infinite computational power.

Shannon proved, using information theoretic considerations, that the one-time pad has a property he termed perfect secrecy; that is, the ciphertext C gives absolutely no additional information about the plaintext. (Note: That is to say, the "information gain" or Kullback–Leibler divergence of the plaintext message from the ciphertext message is zero.) This is because (intuitively), given a truly uniformly random key that is used only once, a ciphertext can be translated into any plaintext of the same length, and all are equally likely. Thus, the a priori probability of a plaintext message M is the same as the a posteriori probability of a plaintext message M given the corresponding ciphertext.

Conventional symmetric encryption algorithms use complex patterns of substitution and transpositions. For the best of these currently in use, it is not known whether there can be a cryptanalytic procedure that can efficiently reverse (or even partially reverse) these transformations without knowing the key used during encryption. Asymmetric encryption algorithms depend on mathematical problems that are thought to be difficult to solve, such as integer factorization or the discrete logarithm. However, there is no proof that these problems are hard, and a mathematical breakthrough could make existing systems vulnerable to attack. (Note: Most asymmetric encryption algorithms rely on the facts that the best known algorithms for prime factorization and computing discrete logarithms are superpolynomial time. There is a strong belief that these problems are not solvable by a Turing machine in time that scales polynomially with input length, rendering them difficult (hopefully, prohibitively so) to be broken via cryptographic attacks. However, this has not been proven.)

Given perfect secrecy, in contrast to conventional symmetric encryption, the one-time pad is immune even to brute-force attacks. Trying all keys simply yields all plaintexts, all equally likely to be the actual plaintext. Even with a partially known plaintext, brute-force attacks cannot be used, since an attacker is unable to gain any information about the parts of the key needed to decrypt the rest of the message. The parts of the plaintext that are known will reveal only the parts of the key corresponding to them, and they correspond on a strictly one-to-one basis; a uniformly random key's bits will be independent.

Quantum cryptography and post-quantum cryptography involve studying the impact of quantum computers on information security. Quantum computers have been shown by Peter Shor and others to be much faster at solving some problems that the security of traditional asymmetric encryption algorithms depends on. The cryptographic algorithms that depend on these problems' difficulty would be rendered obsolete with a powerful enough quantum computer. One-time pads, however, would remain secure, as perfect secrecy does not depend on assumptions about the computational resources of an attacker.

== Problems ==
Despite Shannon's proof of its security, the one-time pad has serious drawbacks in practice because it requires:

- Truly random, as opposed to pseudorandom, one-time pad values, which is a non-trivial requirement. Random number generation in computers is often difficult, and pseudorandom number generators are often used for their speed and usefulness for most applications. True random number generators exist, but are typically slower and more specialized.
- Secure generation and exchange of the one-time pad values, which must be at least as long as the message. This is important because the security of the one-time pad depends on the security of the one-time pad exchange. If an attacker is able to intercept the one-time pad value, they can decrypt messages sent using the one-time pad.
- Careful treatment to make sure that the one-time pad values continue to remain secret and are disposed of correctly, preventing any reuse (partially or entirely)—hence "one-time". Problems with data remanence can make it difficult to completely erase computer media.

One-time pads solve few current practical problems in cryptography. High-quality ciphers are widely available and their security is not currently considered a major worry. Such ciphers are almost always easier to employ than one-time pads because the amount of key material that must be properly and securely generated, distributed and stored is far smaller. Additionally, public key cryptography overcomes the problem of key distribution.

=== True randomness ===
High-quality random numbers are difficult to generate. The random number generation functions in most programming language libraries are not suitable for cryptographic use. Even those generators that are suitable for normal cryptographic use, including /dev/random and many hardware random number generators, may make some use of cryptographic functions whose security has not been proven. An example of a technique for generating pure randomness is measuring radioactive emissions.

In particular, one-time use is absolutely necessary. For example, if $p_1$ and $p_2$ represent two distinct plaintext messages and they are each encrypted by a common key $k$, then the respective ciphertexts are given by:

$$c_1 = p_1 \oplus k$$
$$c_2 = p_2 \oplus k$$

where $\oplus$ means XOR. If an attacker were to have both ciphertexts $c_1$ and $c_2$, then simply taking the XOR of $c_1$ and $c_2$ yields the XOR of the two plaintexts $p_1 \oplus p_2$. (This is because every bitstream XORed with itself gives 0, the identity element of XOR) $p_1 \oplus p_2$ is then the equivalent of a running key cipher.

If both plaintexts are in a natural language (e.g., English or Russian), each stands a very high chance of being recovered by heuristic cryptanalysis, with possibly a few ambiguities. Of course, a longer message can only be broken for the portion that overlaps a shorter message, plus perhaps a little more by completing a word or phrase. The most famous exploit of this vulnerability occurred with the Venona project.

=== Key distribution ===
Because the pad, like all shared secrets, must be passed and kept secure, and the pad has to be at least as long as the message, there is often no point in using a one-time pad, as one can simply send the plain text instead of the pad (as both can be the same size and have to be sent securely). However, once a very long pad has been securely sent (e.g., a computer disk full of random data), it can be used for numerous future messages, until the sum of the messages' sizes equals the size of the pad. Quantum key distribution also proposes a solution to this problem, assuming fault-tolerant quantum computers.

Distributing very long one-time pad keys is inconvenient and usually poses a significant security risk. The pad is essentially the encryption key, but unlike keys for modern ciphers, it must be extremely long and is far too difficult for humans to remember. Storage media such as thumb drives, DVD-Rs or personal digital audio players can be used to carry a very large one-time-pad from place to place in a non-suspicious way, but the need to transport the pad physically is a burden compared to the key negotiation protocols of a modern public-key cryptosystem. Such media cannot reliably be erased securely by any means short of physical destruction (e.g., incineration). A 4.7 GB DVD-R full of one-time-pad data, if shredded into particles 1 mm^{2} (0.0016 sq in) in size, leaves over 4 megabits of data on each particle. In addition, the risk of compromise during transit (for example, a pickpocket swiping, copying and replacing the pad) is likely to be much greater in practice than the likelihood of compromise for a cipher such as AES. Finally, the effort needed to manage one-time pad key material scales very badly for large networks of communicants—the number of pads required goes up as the square of the number of users freely exchanging messages. For communication between only two persons, or a star network topology, this is less of a problem.

The key material must be securely disposed of after use, to ensure the key material is never reused and to protect the messages sent. Because the key material must be transported from one endpoint to another, and persist until the message is sent or received, it can be more vulnerable to forensic recovery than the transient plaintext it protects (because of possible data remanence).

=== Authentication ===
As traditionally used, one-time pads provide no message authentication, the lack of which can pose a security threat in real-world systems. For example, an attacker who knows that the message contains "meet jane and me tomorrow at three thirty pm" can derive the corresponding codes of the pad directly from the two known elements (the encrypted text and the known plaintext). The attacker can then replace that text by any other text of exactly the same length, such as "three thirty meeting is cancelled, stay home". The attacker's knowledge of the one-time pad is limited to this byte length, which must be maintained for any other content of the message to remain valid. This is different from malleability where the plaintext is not necessarily known. Without knowing the message, the attacker can also flip bits in a message sent with a one-time pad, without the recipient being able to detect it. Because of their similarities, attacks on one-time pads are similar to attacks on stream ciphers.

Standard techniques to prevent this, such as the use of a message authentication code can be used along with a one-time pad system to prevent such attacks, as can classical methods such as variable length padding and Russian copulation, but they all lack the perfect security the OTP itself has. Universal hashing provides a way to authenticate messages up to an arbitrary security bound (i.e., for any p > 0, a large enough hash ensures that even a computationally unbounded attacker's likelihood of successful forgery is less than p), but this uses additional random data from the pad, and some of these techniques remove the possibility of implementing the system without a computer.

=== Common implementation errors ===
Due to its relative simplicity of implementation, and due to its promise of perfect secrecy, one-time-pad enjoys high popularity among students learning about cryptography, especially as it is often the first algorithm to be presented and implemented during a course. Such "first" implementations often break the requirements for information theoretical security in one or more ways:

- The pad is generated via some algorithm, that expands one or more small values into a longer "one-time-pad". This applies equally to all algorithms, from insecure basic mathematical operations like square root decimal expansions, to complex, cryptographically secure pseudo-random random number generators (CSPRNGs). None of these implementations are one-time-pads, but stream ciphers by definition. All one-time pads must be generated by a non-algorithmic process, e.g. by a hardware random number generator.
- The pad is exchanged using non-information-theoretically secure methods. If the one-time-pad is encrypted with a non-information theoretically secure algorithm for delivery, the security of the cryptosystem is only as secure as the insecure delivery mechanism. A common flawed delivery mechanism for one-time-pad is a standard hybrid cryptosystem that relies on symmetric key cryptography for pad encryption, and asymmetric cryptography for symmetric key delivery. Common secure methods for one-time pad delivery are quantum key distribution, a sneakernet or courier service, or a dead drop.
- The implementation does not feature an unconditionally secure authentication mechanism such as a one-time MAC.
- The pad is reused (exploited during the Venona project, for example).
- The pad is not destroyed immediately after use.

== Uses ==
=== Applicability ===
Despite its problems, the one-time-pad retains some practical interest. In some hypothetical espionage situations, the one-time pad might be useful because encryption and decryption can be computed by hand with only pencil and paper. Nearly all other high quality ciphers are entirely impractical without computers. In the modern world, however, computers (such as those embedded in mobile phones) are so ubiquitous that possessing a computer suitable for performing conventional encryption (for example, a phone that can run concealed cryptographic software) will usually not attract suspicion.

- The one-time-pad is the optimum cryptosystem with theoretically perfect secrecy.
- The one-time-pad is one of the most practical methods of encryption where one or both parties must do all work by hand, without the aid of a computer. This made it important in the pre-computer era, and it could conceivably still be useful in situations where possession of a computer is illegal or incriminating or where trustworthy computers are not available.
- One-time pads are practical in situations where two parties in a secure environment must be able to depart from one another and communicate from two separate secure environments with perfect secrecy.
- The one-time-pad can be used in superencryption.
- The algorithm most commonly associated with quantum key distribution is the one-time pad.
- The one-time pad is mimicked by stream ciphers.
- Numbers stations often send messages encrypted with a one-time pad.

=== Quantum and post-quantum cryptography ===
A common use of the one-time pad in quantum cryptography is being used in association with quantum key distribution (QKD). QKD is typically associated with the one-time pad because it provides a way of distributing a long shared secret key securely and efficiently (assuming the existence of practical quantum networking hardware). A QKD algorithm uses properties of quantum mechanical systems to let two parties agree on a shared, uniformly random string. Algorithms for QKD, such as BB84, are also able to determine whether an adversarial party has been attempting to intercept key material, and allow for a shared secret key to be agreed upon with relatively few messages exchanged and relatively low computational overhead. At a high level, the schemes work by taking advantage of the destructive way quantum states are measured to exchange a secret and detect tampering. In the original BB84 paper, it was proven that the one-time pad, with keys distributed via QKD, is a perfectly secure encryption scheme. However, this result depends on the QKD scheme being implemented correctly in practice. Attacks on real-world QKD systems exist. For instance, many systems do not send a single photon (or other object in the desired quantum state) per bit of the key because of practical limitations, and an attacker could intercept and measure some of the photons associated with a message, gaining information about the key (i.e. leaking information about the pad), while passing along unmeasured photons corresponding to the same bit of the key. Combining QKD with a one-time pad can also loosen the requirements for key reuse. In 1982, Bennett and Brassard showed that if a QKD protocol does not detect that an adversary was trying to intercept an exchanged key, then the key can safely be reused while preserving perfect secrecy.

The one-time pad is an example of post-quantum cryptography, because perfect secrecy is a definition of security that does not depend on the computational resources of the adversary. Consequently, an adversary with a quantum computer would still not be able to gain any more information about a message encrypted with a one time pad than an adversary with just a classical computer.

=== Historical uses ===
One-time pads have been used in special circumstances since the early 1900s. In 1923, they were employed for diplomatic communications by the German diplomatic establishment. The Weimar Republic Diplomatic Service began using the method in about 1920. The breaking of poor Soviet cryptography by the British, with messages made public for political reasons in two instances in the 1920s (ARCOS case), appear to have caused the Soviet Union to adopt one-time pads for some purposes by around 1930. KGB spies are also known to have used pencil and paper one-time pads more recently. Examples include Colonel Rudolf Abel, who was arrested and convicted in New York City in the 1950s, and the 'Krogers' (i.e., Morris and Lona Cohen), who were arrested and convicted of espionage in the United Kingdom in the early 1960s. Both were found with physical one-time pads in their possession.

A number of nations have used one-time pad systems for their sensitive traffic. Leo Marks reports that the British Special Operations Executive used one-time pads in World War II to encode traffic between its offices. One-time pads for use with its overseas agents were introduced late in the war. A few British one-time tape cipher machines include the Rockex and Noreen. The German Stasi Sprach Machine was also capable of using one time tape that East Germany, Russia, and even Cuba used to send encrypted messages to their agents.

The World War II voice scrambler SIGSALY was also a form of one-time system. It added noise to the signal at one end and removed it at the other end. The noise was distributed to the channel ends in the form of large shellac records that were manufactured in unique pairs. There were both starting synchronization and longer-term phase drift problems that arose and had to be solved before the system could be used.

The hotline between Moscow and Washington, D.C., established in 1963 after the 1962 Cuban Missile Crisis, used teleprinters protected by a commercial one-time tape system. Each country prepared the keying tapes used to encode its messages and delivered them via their embassy in the other country. A unique advantage of the OTP in this case was that neither country had to reveal more sensitive encryption methods to the other.

U.S. Army Special Forces used one-time pads in Vietnam. By using Morse code with one-time pads and continuous wave radio transmission (the carrier for Morse code), they achieved both secrecy and reliable communications.

Starting in 1988, the African National Congress (ANC) used disk-based one-time pads as part of a secure communication system between ANC leaders outside South Africa and in-country operatives as part of Operation Vula, a successful effort to build a resistance network inside South Africa. Random numbers on the disk were erased after use. A Belgian flight attendant acted as courier to bring in the pad disks. A regular resupply of new disks was needed as they were used up fairly quickly. One problem with the system was that it could not be used for secure data storage. Later Vula added a stream cipher keyed by book codes to solve this problem.

A related notion is the one-time code—a signal, used only once; e.g., "Alpha" for "mission completed", "Bravo" for "mission failed" or even "Torch" for "Allied invasion of French Northern Africa" cannot be "decrypted" in any reasonable sense of the word. Understanding the message will require additional information, often 'depth' of repetition, or some traffic analysis. However, such strategies (though often used by real operatives, and baseball coaches) are not a cryptographic one-time pad in any significant sense.

=== NSA ===
At least into the 1970s, the U.S. National Security Agency (NSA) produced a variety of manual one-time pads, both general purpose and specialized, with 86,000 one-time pads produced in fiscal year 1972. Special purpose pads were produced for what the NSA called "pro forma" systems, where "the basic framework, form or format of every message text is identical or nearly so; the same kind of information, message after message, is to be presented in the same order, and only specific values, like numbers, change with each message." Examples included nuclear launch messages and radio direction finding reports (COMUS).

General purpose pads were produced in several formats, a simple list of random letters (DIANA) or just numbers (CALYPSO), tiny pads for covert agents (MICKEY MOUSE), and pads designed for more rapid encoding of short messages, at the cost of lower density. One example, ORION, had 50 rows of plaintext alphabets on one side and the corresponding random cipher text letters on the other side. By placing a sheet on top of a piece of carbon paper with the carbon face up, one could circle one letter in each row on one side and the corresponding letter on the other side would be circled by the carbon paper. Thus one ORION sheet could quickly encode or decode a message up to 50 characters long. Production of ORION pads required printing both sides in exact registration, a difficult process, so NSA switched to another pad format, MEDEA, with 25 rows of paired alphabets and random characters. (See Commons:Category:NSA one-time pads for illustrations.)

The NSA also built automated systems for the "centralized headquarters of CIA and Special Forces units so that they can efficiently process the many separate one-time pad messages to and from individual pad holders in the field".

During World War II and into the 1950s, the U.S. made extensive use of one-time tape systems. In addition to providing confidentiality, circuits secured by one-time tape ran continually, even when there was no traffic, thus protecting against traffic analysis. In 1955, NSA produced some 1,660,000 rolls of one time tape. Each roll was 8 inches in diameter, contained 100,000 characters, lasted 166 minutes and cost $4.55 to produce. By 1972, only 55,000 rolls were produced, as one-time tapes were replaced by rotor machines such as SIGTOT, and later by electronic devices based on shift registers. The NSA describes one-time tape systems like 5-UCO and SIGTOT as being used for intelligence traffic until the introduction of the electronic cipher based KW-26 in 1957.

=== Exploits ===
While one-time pads provide perfect secrecy if generated and used properly, small mistakes can lead to successful cryptanalysis:

- In 1944–1945, the U.S. Army's Signals Intelligence Service was able to solve a one-time pad system used by the German Foreign Office for its high-level traffic, codenamed GEE. GEE was insecure because the pads were not sufficiently random—the machine used to generate the pads produced predictable output.
- In 1945, the US discovered that Canberra–Moscow messages were being encrypted first using a code-book and then using a one-time pad. However, the one-time pad used was the same one used by Moscow for Washington, D.C.–Moscow messages. Combined with the fact that some of the Canberra–Moscow messages included known British government documents, this allowed some of the encrypted messages to be broken.
- One-time pads were employed by Soviet espionage agencies for covert communications with agents and agent controllers. Analysis has shown that these pads were generated by typists using actual typewriters. This method is not truly random, as it makes the pads more likely to contain certain convenient key sequences more frequently. This proved to be generally effective because the pads were still somewhat unpredictable because the typists were not following rules, and different typists produced different patterns of pads. Without copies of the key material used, only some defect in the generation method or reuse of keys offered much hope of cryptanalysis. Beginning in the late 1940s, US and UK intelligence agencies were able to break some of the Soviet one-time pad traffic to Moscow during WWII as a result of errors made in generating and distributing the key material. One suggestion is that Moscow Centre personnel were somewhat rushed by the presence of German troops just outside Moscow in late 1941 and early 1942, and they produced more than one copy of the same key material during that period. This decades-long effort was finally codenamed VENONA (BRIDE had been an earlier name); it produced a considerable amount of information. Even so, only a small percentage of the intercepted messages were either fully or partially decrypted (a few thousand out of several hundred thousand).

== See also ==
- Agrippa (A Book of the Dead)
- Information theoretic security
- Numbers station
- One-time password
- Session key
- Steganography
- Tradecraft
- Unicity distance
- No-hiding theorem
