= Franklin F. Miller =

American politician

Franklin F. Miller was a politician in South Carolina. He represented Georgetown, South Carolina, at the Constitutional Convention of 1868 and served in the state legislature. His photograph was included in a montage with other Radical Republican legislators. He was identified as "colored" and had not been recorded on tax roles. A document related to the 1868 Convention identifies him as white.
