= Frank Miller (infielder) =

American baseball player

- Infielder
- Born: December 17, 1867; Cumberland, Maryland, U.S.
- Died: November 2, 1942 (aged 74); Pittsburgh, Pennsylvania, U.S.

Negro league baseball debut
- 1887, for the Pittsburgh Keystones

Last appearance
- 1896, for the Cuban X-Giants

Teams
- Pittsburgh Keystones (1887); Cuban Giants (1887, 1891); New York Gorhams (1891); Cuban X-Giants (1896)

Frank Miller (December 17, 1867 – November 2, 1942) was an American Negro league infielder in the 1880s and 1890s.

A native of Cumberland, Maryland, Miller made his Negro leagues debut in 1887 with the Pittsburgh Keystones and the Cuban Giants. He played for the Giants again in 1891, and also played for the New York Gorhams that season. Miller finished his career in 1896 with the Cuban X-Giants. He died in Pittsburgh, Pennsylvania in 1942 at age 74.
