= Frank Miller (South African cricketer) =

South African cricketer (1880–1958)

Frank Noble Miller (April 8, 1880 – June 3, 1958) was a cricketer from the Colony of Natal active from 1904 to 1910 who played for Lancashire and Natal. He was born in the Orange Free State and died in Natal. He appeared in two first-class matches as a righthanded batsman, scoring 64 runs with a highest score of 37 and held two catches.
