= Étienne Bazeries =

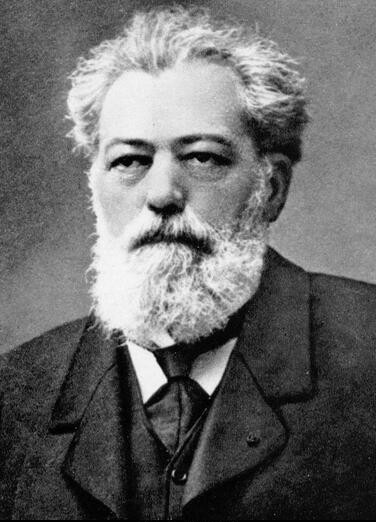
- Born: August 21, 1846; Port Vendres, France
- Died: November 7, 1931 (aged 85); Noyon
- Occupations: Soldier, military cryptographer
- Years active: 1863–1924
- Known for: Developing the Bazeries Cylinder
- Spouse: Marie-Louise-Elodie Berthon
- Children: 3

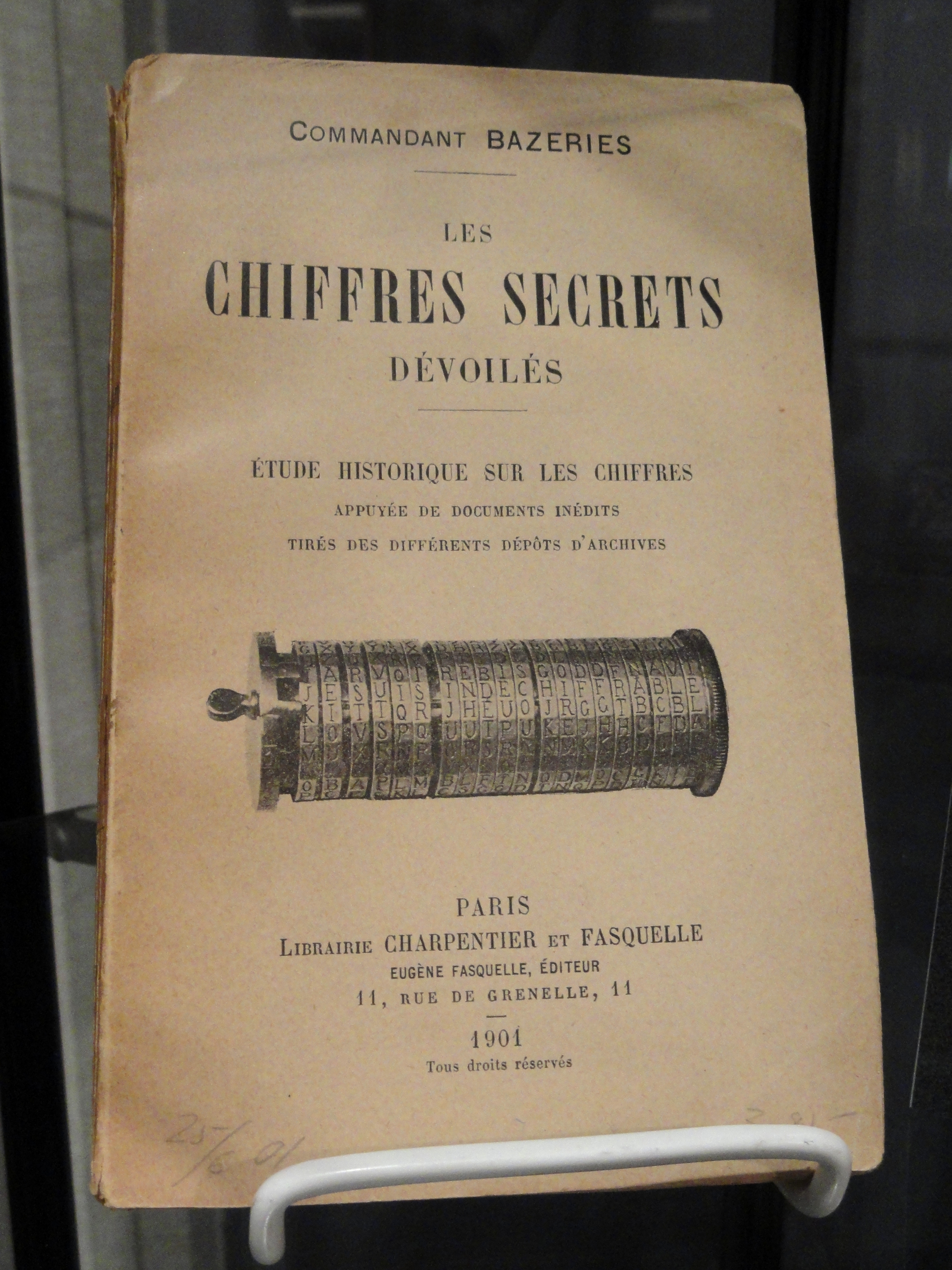
Les Chiffres secrets dévoilés (or The Secret Numbers Unveiled )by Étienne Bazeries

Étienne Bazeries (21 August 1846, in Port Vendres – 7 November 1931, in Noyon) was a French military cryptanalyst active between 1890 and the First World War. He is best known for developing the "Bazeries Cylinder", an improved version of Thomas Jefferson's cipher cylinder. It was later refined into the US Army M-94 cipher device. Historian David Kahn describes him as "the great pragmatist of cryptology. His theoretical contributions are negligible, but he was one of the greatest natural cryptanalysts the science has seen." (Kahn 1996, p244)

Bazeries was born in Port-Vendres, France, the son of a mounted policeman. In 1863 he enlisted in the army, and fought in the Franco-Prussian War, where he was taken prisoner, although he later managed to escape disguised as a bricklayer. In 1874 he was promoted to lieutenant, and sent to Algeria in 1875. He returned to France the following year and married Marie-Louise-Elodie Berthon, with whom he would father three daughters: Césarine, Fernande and Paule.

He apparently became interested in cryptography through solving cryptograms in newspapers' personal columns, and soon applied his cryptanalytic skills in a military context when, in 1890, he solved messages enciphered with the official French military transposition system, causing the War Ministry to change to a new scheme. In an effort to prompt reform within the government and enhance national security, Bazeries further exposed weaknesses in French cipher systems. In 1891, news of his talent had spread, and he began work for the Ministry of Foreign Affairs' Bureau du Chiffre. Bazeries continued his cryptanalytic work there even after he retired from the Army in 1899, assisting in solving German military ciphers during World War I. However, many of Bazeries recommendations to the government for improvements in official cipher systems met severe bureaucracy and rebuffs, which became a constant source of frustration for him in an otherwise illustrious career. He retired in 1924, aged 78.

In the 1890s he broke a famous nomenclator system called the "Great Cipher", created by the Rossignols in the 17th century. One of the messages referred to the famous Man in the Iron Mask and provided a possible solution to the mystery. His influential 1901 text Les Chiffres secrets dévoilés ("Secret ciphers unveiled") is considered a landmark in cryptographic literature.

== References & Footnotes ==
=== References ===
- Candela, Rosario, The Military Cipher of Commandant Bazeries. New York: Cardanus Press, 1938. This book provided good detail of Bazaries as a cryptanalyst.
- Kahn, David, The Codebreakers. 1967, 2d ed. 1996. (ISBN 0-684-83130-9)
