= Fredrik Gripenstierna =

Personal details
- Born: December 15, 1728 Håtuna, Sweden
- Died: February 25, 1804 (aged 75) Stockholm, Sweden

Fredrik Gripenstierna (1728–1804) was a Swedish nobleman and member of the Gripenstierna clan. He is remembered for having built a cipher device regarded as the world's first cryptographic machine.

== Early life ==
Fredrik Gripenstierna's father was Carl Gripenstierna (1668–1746), a land-owner of Ekerö. His mother was Hedvig Polhem (1705–1769), the daughter of Christopher Polhem, a well-known Swedish inventor and a member of the Royal Swedish Academy of Sciences.

In his youth, he attended Uppsala University before joining the Swedish Army. In 1748, at the age of 20, he served as an officer on the island fortress of Sveaborg. He left the military in 1752. In 1755, he was promoted to the aristocratic rank of freiherr and from then on lived off the income generated by his manorial estate. Gripenstierna later served as master of the hunt (hovjägmästare) to King Gustav III.

== Gripenstierna's cipher machine ==
On 1786, Gripenstierna received the permission of King Gustav III to demonstrate a prototype cipher device at Drottningholm Palace. Gripenstierna manufactured his device with the assistance of the Swedish Army mechanist Charles Apelquist.

Although Gripenstierna himself had some technical expertise and claimed to have invented the device "based on the principles [he] learned in [his] youth from [...] the late [...] Christopher Polhem", it is believed that it was actually based on technical drawings prepared by his grandfather Polhem which he had subsequently inherited. Neither the device itself nor any drawings of it survive today, and as a result its appearance and manner of operation can only be inferred from written descriptions. One such description is found in a document entitled Proposal for a Cipher Machine (Förslag till Chiffre-Machine). Because Polhem's original drawings also no longer exist, it is impossible to tell to what extent Gripenstierna incorporated his own ideas into the design.

The device appears to have been similar to the later Jefferson–Bazeries cylinder, with 57 discs rotating on a central axis and engraved round the outer edge with the letters of the Swedish alphabet. In addition, the discs included a small assortment of special characters such as a space and a full stop. By permuting the order of the 57 discs, there were approximately 4×10⁷⁶ possible combinations, resulting in a key length of more than 254 bits — a high level of cryptographic strength even by today's standards. Friedrich L. Bauer described Gripenstierna's device as having provided the strongest encryption in the world at the time.

== Legacy ==
In the 1970s, Boris Hagelin of Crypto AG built two replicas of Gripenstierna's cipher machine based on surviving documents from the 1786 demonstration at Drottningholm Palace. In 1976, Bengt Beckman produced a sketch of the device as it was reconstructed by Hagelin.
