= Franklin Miller, Jr. =

American physicist (1912–2012)

Franklin Miller Jr.
- Born: September 8, 1912; St. Louis, Missouri, U.S.
- Died: October 4, 2012 (aged 100)
- Education: Swarthmore College (B.A.); University of Chicago (Ph.D.)
- Known for: College Physics; physics demonstration films; Millikan Award
- Awards: Robert A. Millikan Medal (1970)
- Scientific career
- Fields: Physics, physics education
- Workplaces: Rutgers University; Kenyon College

Franklin Miller Jr. (September 8, 1912 – October 4, 2012) was an American physicist, textbook author, and professor at Kenyon College. He wrote an introductory physics textbook College Physics, created his single-concept physics demonstration films funded by the National Science Foundation, and had a long career as a teacher and scholar. Miller received the 1970 Robert A. Millikan Medal for distinguished contributions to physics education. Kenyon College later named the Franklin Miller Observatory in his honor.

== Early life and education ==
Miller was born on September 8, 1912 in St. Louis, Missouri, to Franklin Miller, a lawyer and judge, and Maude Barnes, a writer.

He graduated from Swarthmore College in 1933 with a bachelor's degree in mathematics, where he also played soccer and participated in track. Miller earned his Ph.D. in physics from the University of Chicago in 1939, specializing in X-ray physics research, including experimental and theoretical studies on X-ray diffraction.

== Academic career ==
Miller joined the physics faculty at Rutgers University in 1937. During his time at Rutgers he conducted research on double-crystal spectrometer theory, radioactive tracers in biology, and discontinuities in thermal expansion coefficients.

In 1948 Miller joined the faculty of Kenyon College as professor of physics. He remained at Kenyon for more than three decades, retiring from full-time teaching in 1981 but returning for the 1985–86 academic year. He taught both introductory and advanced physics and became an influential figure in the development of the department.

== Textbooks and contributions to physics education ==
Miller authored College Physics in 1959, a widely adopted introductory textbook that sold nearly one million copies and remained in use for decades. He also co-authored Concepts in Physics, a textbook developed for secondary schools and used across the United States.

In 1963, Miller received funding from the National Science Foundation to produce a series of physics demonstration films, each focused on a single concept. The films were widely distributed to high-school and college teachers, and were featured at the 1964 joint meeting of the American Association of Physics Teachers and the American Physical Society. One of his films preserved the now-iconic motion-picture footage of the Tacoma Narrows Bridge collapse.

In recognition of his innovative work in physics pedagogy, Miller received the 1970 Robert A. Millikan Medal from the AAPT.

== Service to Kenyon College and community ==
Miller played a key role in introducing computing to Kenyon College. In 1968 he helped secure the installation of the college’s first digital computer, an IBM 1130, and became Kenyon’s first in-house computer specialist.

Beyond his scientific activities, Miller was an accomplished amateur violist who performed with the early Knox County Symphony Orchestra and regularly played chamber music with colleagues and friends. He also coached the Kenyon men's soccer team in the early 1950s.

A dedicated genealogist, Miller published three family-history books documenting more than 21,000 relatives. He also worked with local genealogical societies to compile archival records.

== Legacy ==
Kenyon College named its campus observatory the Franklin Miller Jr. Observatory in recognition of his long service to the college and its scientific community.

The Franklin Miller Award is given annually to Kenyon College students who make unusual or significant contributions to the academic environment of the college.

A memorial minute prepared by colleagues described Miller as the “backbone of the physics department” and “a rare combination of theoretical and experimental talent.”

== Death ==
Miller died on October 4, 2012, at the age of 100.

== Selected works ==
- Miller, Franklin (1967). College physics. --. Internet Archive. New York : Harcourt, Brace & World.
- Concepts in Physics: A High School Physics Program, by F. Miller, Thomas J. Dillon & Malcolm K. Smith. 1974.
- NSF-funded physics demonstration film series (1963), including the preservation of the Tacoma Narrows Bridge collapse footage.
