= Frank Winfird Millar =

New Zealand public servant and union official

Frank Winfird Millar (20 September 1885 – 4 September 1944) was a notable New Zealand public servant and union official. He was born in Dunedin, New Zealand on 20 September 1885.
