= Code (cryptography) =

Method used to encrypt a message

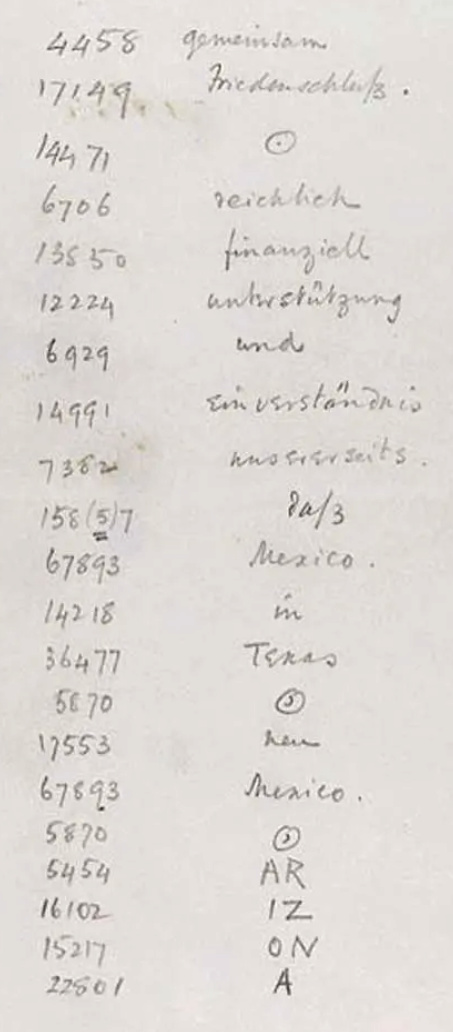
A portion of the "Zimmermann Telegram" as decrypted by British Naval Intelligence codebreakers. The word Arizona was not in the German codebook and had therefore to be split into phonetic syllables.

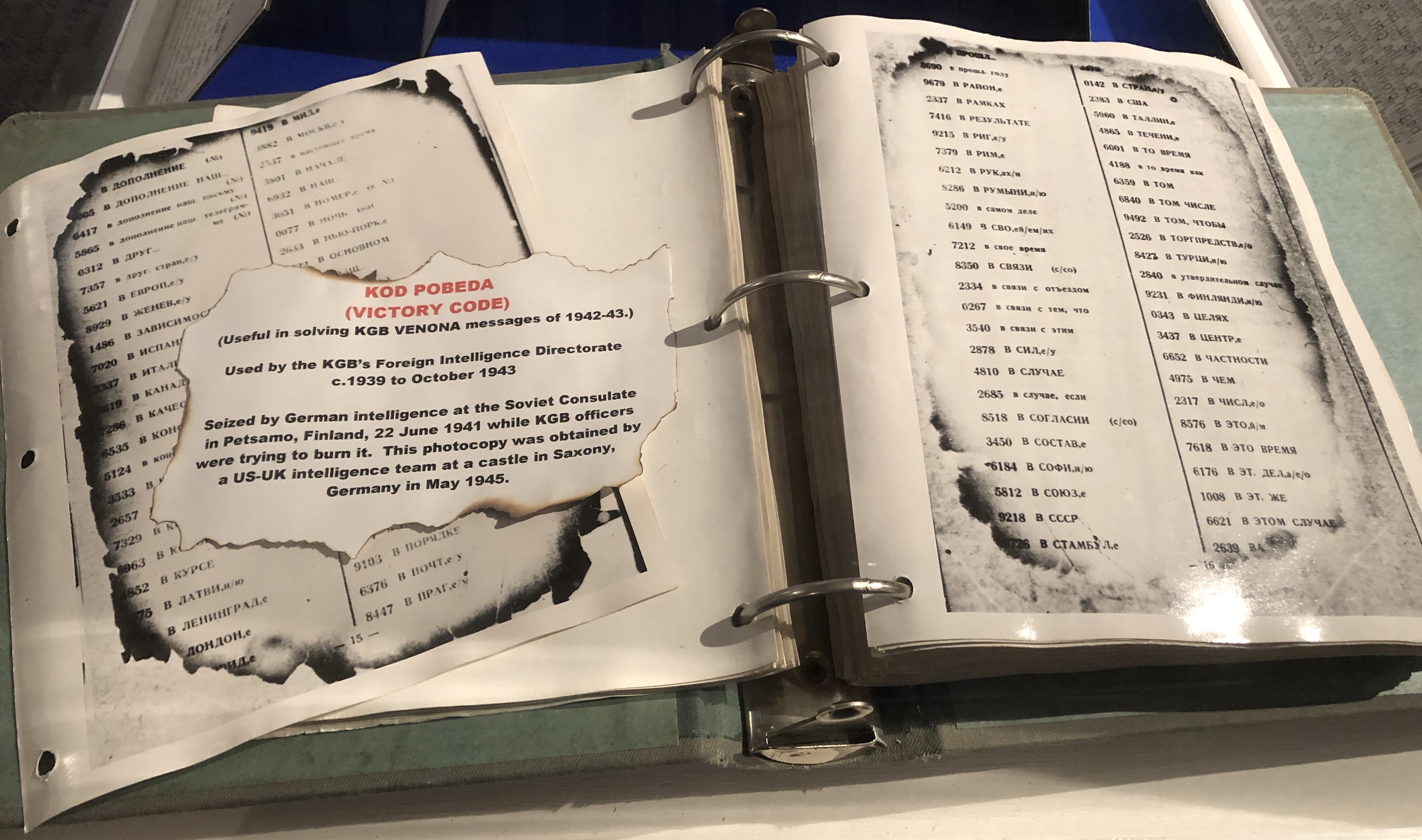
Partially burnt pages from a World War II Soviet KGB two-part codebook

In cryptology, a code is a method used to encrypt a message that operates at the level of meaning; that is, words or phrases are converted into something else. A code might transform "change" into "CVGDK" or "cocktail lounge". The U.S. National Security Agency defined a code as "A substitution cryptosystem in which the plaintext elements are primarily words, phrases, or sentences, and the code equivalents (called "code groups") typically consist of letters or digits (or both) in otherwise meaningless combinations of identical length." A codebook is needed to encrypt, and decrypt the phrases or words.

By contrast, ciphers encrypt messages at the level of individual letters, or small groups of letters, or even, in modern ciphers, individual bits. Messages can be transformed first by a code, and then by a cipher. Such multiple encryption, or "superencryption" aims to make cryptanalysis more difficult.

Another comparison between codes and ciphers is that a code typically represents a letter or groups of letters directly without the use of mathematics. As such the numbers are configured to represent these three values: 1001 = A, 1002 = B, 1003 = C, ... . The resulting message, then would be 1001 1002 1003 to communicate ABC. Ciphers, however, utilize a mathematical formula to represent letters or groups of letters. For example, A = 1, B = 2, C = 3, ... . Thus the message ABC results by multiplying each letter's value by 13. The message ABC, then would be 13 26 39.

Codes have a variety of drawbacks, including susceptibility to cryptanalysis and the difficulty of managing the cumbersome codebooks, so ciphers are now the dominant technique in modern cryptography.

In contrast, because codes are representational, they are not susceptible to mathematical analysis of the individual codebook elements. In the example, the message 13 26 39 can be cracked by dividing each number by 13 and then ranking them alphabetically. However, the focus of codebook cryptanalysis is the comparative frequency of the individual code elements matching the same frequency of letters within the plaintext messages using frequency analysis. In the above example, the code group, 1001, 1002, 1003, might occur more than once and that frequency might match the number of times that ABC occurs in plain text messages.

(In the past, or in non-technical contexts, code and cipher are often used to refer to any form of encryption).

== One- and two-part codes ==
Codes are defined by "codebooks" (physical or notional), which are dictionaries of codegroups listed with their corresponding plaintext. Codes originally had the codegroups assigned in 'plaintext order' for convenience of the code designed, or the encoder. For example, in a code using numeric code groups, a plaintext word starting with "a" would have a low-value group, while one starting with "z" would have a high-value group. The same codebook could be used to "encode" a plaintext message into a coded message or "codetext", and "decode" a codetext back into plaintext message.

In order to make life more difficult for codebreakers, codemakers designed codes with no predictable relationship between the codegroups and the ordering of the matching plaintext. In practice, this meant that two codebooks were now required, one to find codegroups for encoding, the other to look up codegroups to find plaintext for decoding. Such "two-part" codes required more effort to develop, and twice as much effort to distribute (and discard safely when replaced), but they were harder to break. The Zimmermann Telegram in January 1917 used the German diplomatic "0075" two-part code system which contained upwards of 10,000 phrases and individual words.

== One-time code ==
A one-time code is a prearranged word, phrase or symbol that is intended to be used only once to convey a simple message, often the signal to execute or abort some plan or confirm that it has succeeded or failed. One-time codes are often designed to be included in what would appear to be an innocent conversation. Done properly they are almost impossible to detect, though a trained analyst monitoring the communications of someone who has already aroused suspicion might be able to recognize a comment like "Aunt Bertha has gone into labor" as having an ominous meaning. Famous example of one time codes include:

- In the Bible, Jonathan prearranges a code with David, who is going into hiding from Jonathan's father, King Saul. If, during archery practice, Jonathan tells the servant retrieving arrows "the arrows are on this side of you," David may safely return to court; if the command is "the arrows are beyond you," David must flee.
- "One if by land; two if by sea" in "Paul Revere's Ride" made famous in the poem by Henry Wadsworth Longfellow
- "Climb Mount Niitaka" - the signal to Japanese planes to begin the attack on Pearl Harbor
- During World War II the British Broadcasting Corporation's overseas service frequently included "personal messages" as part of its regular broadcast schedule. The seemingly nonsensical stream of messages read out by announcers were actually one time codes intended for Special Operations Executive (SOE) agents operating behind enemy lines. An example might be "The princess wears red shoes" or "Mimi's cat is asleep under the table". Each code message was read out twice. By such means, the French Resistance were instructed to start sabotaging rail and other transport links the night before D-day.
- "Over all of Spain, the sky is clear" was a signal (broadcast on radio) to start the nationalist military revolt in Spain on July 17, 1936.

Sometimes messages are not prearranged and rely on shared knowledge hopefully known only to the recipients. An example is the telegram sent to U.S. President Harry Truman, then at the Potsdam Conference to meet with Soviet premier Joseph Stalin, informing Truman of the first successful test of an atomic bomb.

"Operated on this morning. Diagnosis not yet complete but results seem satisfactory and already exceed expectations. Local press release necessary as interest extends great distance. Dr. Groves pleased. He returns tomorrow. I will keep you posted."

== Idiot code ==
An idiot code is a code that is created by the parties using it. This type of communication is akin to the hand signals used by armies in the field.

Example: Any sentence where 'day' and 'night' are used means 'attack'. The location mentioned in the following sentence specifies the location to be attacked.

- Plaintext: Attack X.
- Codetext: We walked day and night through the streets but couldn't find it! Tomorrow we'll head into X.

An early use of the term appears to be by George Perrault, a character in the science fiction book Friday by Robert A. Heinlein:

The simplest sort [of code] and thereby impossible to break. The first ad told the person or persons concerned to carry out number seven or expect number seven or it said something about something designated as seven. This one says the same with respect to code item number ten. But the meaning of the numbers cannot be deduced through statistical analysis because the code can be changed long before a useful statistical universe can be reached. It's an idiot code... and an idiot code can never be broken if the user has the good sense not to go too often to the well.

Terrorism expert Magnus Ranstorp said that the men who carried out the September 11 attacks on the United States used basic e-mail and what he calls "idiot code" to discuss their plans.

== Cryptanalysis of codes ==
While solving a monoalphabetic substitution cipher is easy, solving even a simple code is difficult. Decrypting a coded message is a little like trying to translate a document written in a foreign language, with the task basically amounting to building up a "dictionary" of the codegroups and the plaintext words they represent.

One fingerhold on a simple code is the fact that some words are more common than others, such as "the" or "a" in English. In telegraphic messages, the codegroup for "STOP" (i.e., end of sentence or paragraph) is usually very common. This helps define the structure of the message in terms of sentences, if not their meaning, and this is cryptanalytically useful.

Further progress can be made against a code by collecting many codetexts encrypted with the same code and then using information from other sources

- spies
- newspapers
- diplomatic cocktail party chat
- the location from where a message was sent
- where it was being sent to (i.e., traffic analysis)
- the time the message was sent,
- events occurring before and after the message was sent
- the normal habits of the people sending the coded messages
- etc.

For example, a particular codegroup found almost exclusively in messages from a particular army and nowhere else might very well indicate the commander of that army. A codegroup that appears in messages preceding an attack on a particular location may very well stand for that location.

Cribs can be an immediate giveaway to the definitions of codegroups. As codegroups are determined, they can gradually build up a critical mass, with more and more codegroups revealed from context and educated guesswork. Simple one-part codes are more vulnerable to such educated guesswork than two-part codes, since if the codenumber "26839" of a one-part code is determined to stand for "bulldozer", then the lower codenumber "17598" will likely stand for a plaintext word that starts with "a" or "b".

Various tricks can be used to "plant" or "sow" information into a coded message, for example by executing a raid at a particular time and location against an enemy, and then examining code messages sent after the raid. Coding errors are a particularly useful fingerhold into a code; people reliably make errors, sometimes disastrous ones. Planting data and exploiting errors works against ciphers as well.

- The most obvious and, in principle at least, simplest way of cracking a code is to steal the codebook through bribery, burglary, or raiding parties — procedures sometimes glorified by the phrase "practical cryptography" — and this is a weakness for both codes and ciphers, though codebooks are generally larger and used longer than cipher keys. While a good code may be harder to break than a cipher, the need to write and distribute codebooks is seriously troublesome.

Constructing a new code is like building a new language and writing a dictionary for it; it was an especially big job before computers. If a code is compromised, the entire task must be done all over again, and that means a lot of work for both cryptographers and the code users. In practice, when codes were in widespread use, they were usually changed on a periodic basis to frustrate codebreakers, and to limit the useful life of stolen or copied codebooks.

Once codes have been created, codebook distribution is logistically clumsy, and increases chances the code will be compromised. There is a saying that "Three people can keep a secret if two of them are dead," (Benjamin Franklin - Wikiquote) and though it may be something of an exaggeration, a secret becomes harder to keep if it is shared among several people. Codes can be thought reasonably secure if they are only used by a few careful people, but if whole armies use the same codebook, security becomes much more difficult.

In contrast, the security of ciphers is generally dependent on protecting the cipher keys. Cipher keys can be stolen and people can betray them, but they are much easier to change and distribute.

== Superencipherment ==
It was common to encipher a message after first encoding it, to increase the difficulty of cryptanalysis. With a numerical code, this was commonly done with an "additive" - simply a long key number which was digit-by-digit added to the code groups, modulo 10. Unlike the codebooks, additives would be changed frequently. The famous Japanese Navy code, JN-25, was of this design.

== Sources ==
- Kahn, David (1996). The Codebreakers : The Comprehensive History of Secret Communication from Ancient Times to the Internet. Scribner.
- Pickover, Cliff (2000). Cryptorunes: Codes and Secret Writing. Pomegranate Communications. ISBN 978-0-7649-1251-1.
- Boak, David G. (July 1973) [1966]. "Codes" (PDF). A History of U.S. Communications Security; the David G. Boak Lectures, Vol. I (2015 declassification review ed.). Ft. George G. Meade, MD: U.S. National Security Agency. pp. 21–32.
- American Army Field Codes In the American Expeditionary Forces During The First World War, William Friedman, U.S. War Department, June 1942. Exhibits many examples in its appendix, including a "Baseball code" (p. 254)

== See also ==
- Cipher
- Code, its more general communications meaning
- Trench code
- JN-25
- Zimmermann telegram
- Code talkers
- This article, or an earlier version of it, incorporates material from Greg Goebel's Codes, Ciphers, & Codebreaking.
