= Rossignols =

French family of cryptologists and mathematicians

The Rossignols, a family of French cryptographers and cryptanalysts, included Antoine Rossignol (1600–1682), Bonaventure Rossignol and Antoine-Bonaventure Rossignol. The family name means "nightingale" in French. As early as 1406, the word rossignol has served as the French term for "skeleton key" or for any tool which opens that which is locked.

== Antoine Rossignol ==
In 1626, Henri II of Bourbon, Prince de Condé laid siege to the Huguenot city of Réalmont. The besiegers intercepted a coded letter leaving the city. Rossignol, then a 26-year-old mathematician, had a local reputation for his interest in cryptography. He quickly broke the Huguenot cipher, revealing a plea to their allies for ammunition to replenish the city's almost exhausted supplies. The next day, the besiegers presented the clear text of the message to the commander of Réalmont, along with a demand for surrender. The Huguenots surrendered immediately.

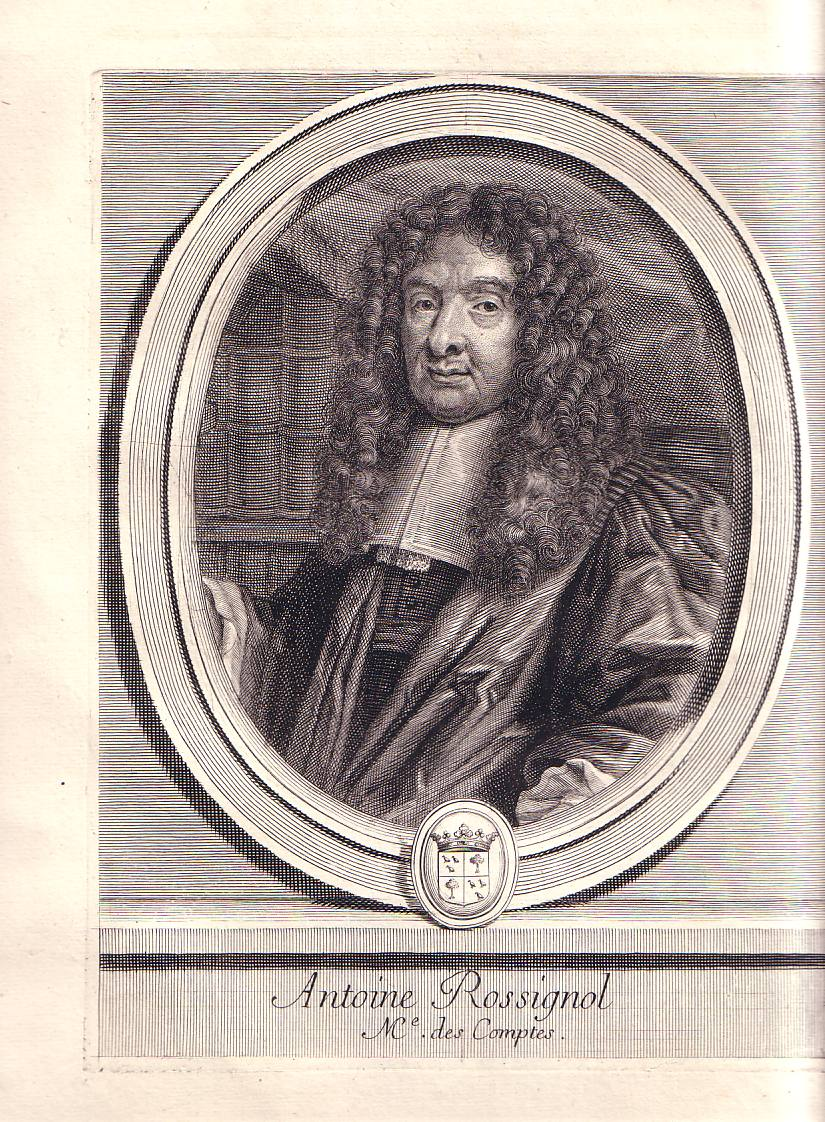
Antoine Rossignol.

This brought Rossignol to the attention of Louis XIII's chief minister, Cardinal Richelieu, who found secure ciphers and codes of immense use to his diplomatic and intelligence corps. Rossignol repeated his swift decipherment of Huguenot messages at the siege of La Rochelle in 1628, helping to inform French strategy and, according to one historian, founding "the great French tradition of expertise in cryptology."

Rossignol improved the nomenclators (cipher tables) used by the French court for their own dispatches. A nomenclator comprises a hybrid of code and cipher. Notable words go into code rather than getting spelled out, while the bulk of the message consists of simple cipher. Before, to make them compact, the alphabetical order of the clear words would correspond closely to the order of the code, so that the codes for the English words "Artois," "Bavaria," "cannon," and "castle" would appear in that order. Rossignol insisted on using out-of-order correspondences, necessitating the use of two tables, one for clear text to code, the other for code to clear text, organized to make finding the first element easy, without reference to the order of the second.

Rossignol married Catherine Quentin, the daughter of a nobleman and the niece of a bishop. They had two children, Bonaventure and Marie, and "their marriage was a happy one, full of playfulness and endearments."

On his deathbed, Louis XIII told his queen that Rossignol was among the men "most necessary to the good of the state." The Abbé de Boisrobert wrote a poem in praise of Rossignol, Epistres en Vers.

== Later generations ==
In the era of Louis XIV (reigned 1643–1715), Antoine Rossignol and his son, Bonaventure, worked either at their estate at Juvisy near Paris or in a room next to the King's study at Versailles. For him they developed the Great Cipher (also called the Grand Cipher) of Louis XIV. They alone mastered it, encoding letters, memoranda, and records. The Rossignols ran the Cabinet noir, the French Black Chamber (founded when Louvois served as Minister of War), so notable that "black chamber" became an international term for any code bureau.

A generation later, when Bonaventure's son, Antoine-Bonaventure, died, the Grand Cipher fell out of use. Without the key, and even the base concept, it remained uncrackable until the late 19th century, when Etienne Bazeries deciphered it after three years of work. Until this time, historians remained unable to read the coded diplomatic records of the time in the French archives.

Antoine Rossignol had the title of "King's counselor." Both Bonaventure and Antoine-Bonaventure Rossignol reached the position of "president of the Chamber of Accounts."

== In fiction ==
Bonaventure Rossignol is an important character in The Baroque Cycle series by Neal Stephenson.
