= Inputlog =

Inputlog is one of the most used keyloggers. It enables researchers to observe the online writing process unobtrusively. It logs every input action that is used to produce a text, viz. keystrokes (incl. navigation keys), mouse movements and clicks and speech input via Dragon Naturally Speaking (Nuance). The program also provides a timestamp (in ms) and detailed information about the Windows environment that is activated (e.g. URL of a web page). Researchers can download the program from the Inputlog website for free (after registration).

Inputlog features five modules:

1. Record module: This module logs (keyboard, mouse, and speech) data in Microsoft Word and other Windows-based programs together with a unique timestamp. Moreover, in MS Word this module also logs character position, actual document length, and copy/paste/move actions.
2. Pre-process module: This module allows researchers to process data from various perspectives: event-based (keyboard, mouse and speech), time-based or based on window changes (sources: MS Word, Internet, etc.).
3. Analyze module: This module features three process representations (general and linear logging file and the s-notation of the text) and four aggregated levels of analysis (summary, pause, revision, and source analyses). Additionally, a process graph is produced.
4. Post-process module: This module integrates single or multiple log files from Inputlog or other observation tools and also makes it possible to merge multiple output files for further statistical analysis in, for instance, SPSS, R or MLWin.
5. Play module: This module plays back the recorded session. The replay is data-based.

Inputlog also allows you to measure the (technical) typing skill of a participant. To this end, a so-called 'Inputlog copy task' has been developed in more than ten languages.
