= Third Department of the General Staff Department =

Chinese military unit

- Active: 1950–2016
- Country: People's Republic of China
- Allegiance: Chinese Communist Party
- Part of: Joint Staff Department of the Central Military Commission

The Third Department (3PLA) of the People's Liberation Army Joint Staff Department was responsible for China's military computer network operations (CNO) and signals intelligence (SIGINT) operations. It has been compared to the United States' National Security Agency or British GCHQ. In 2016, its functions were transferred to the Network Systems Department of the PLA Strategic Support Force.

== History ==
3PLA oversees an extensive network of SIGINT stations throughout China and abroad that collect and process intelligence. 3PLA operates listening stations in Cuba, and also possibly in North Korea, Pakistan, and Djibouti. 3PLA has a large staff of linguists and technicians and is the largest Chinese intelligence agency. Subsequently, 3PLA and 4PLA are the two largest players in China's CNO. They share several responsibilities: cyber intelligence collection, R&D on information security, and the joint management of network attack and defense training systems. 4PLA's offensive mission is the key differentiator between 3PLA and 4PLA. The INEW doctrine consolidates this offensive mission under 4PLA, while 3PLA is left responsible for intelligence gathering and network defense. The personnel at 3PLA are also a key differentiator, since there is no indication that 4PLA has the analysis capabilities that 3PLA possesses, suggesting that 3PLA may analyze and exploit the cyber information that 4PLA gathers in their offensive missions. One interesting point is the importance of understanding adversary's “red lines” when conducting offensive IW actions to avoid unintended escalation, including assessments on how dependent opponents are on a single network node or a specific network. 3PLA or another PLA intelligence organization may provide these assessments and inform 4PLA operations.

In 2016, as part of military reforms in the PLA, the General Staff Department was abolished. The Fourth Department's functions were likely transferred to the Network Systems Department of the PLA Strategic Support Force.

== See also ==
- Intelligence Bureau of the Joint Staff Department (2PLA)
- Fourth Department of the General Staff Department (4PLA)

== Sources ==
- Feakin, Tobias (June 2013). "Enter the Cyber Dragon: Understanding Chinese Intelligence Agencies' Cyber Capabilities" (PDF). Australian Strategic Policy Institute (50).
- Krekel, Bryan (2009). Capability of the People's Republic of China to Conduct Cyber Warfare and Computer Network Exploitation (PDF). McLean, VA: Northrop Grumman/United States-China Economic and Security Review Commission. ISBN 978-1-4379-4285-9.
- Prakash, Rahul (March 2013). "China and Cyberspace" (PDF). ORF Issue Brief (52). Observer Research Foundation.
- Sharma, Deepak (April 2010). "Integrated Network Electronic Warfare: China's New Concept of Information Warfare" (PDF). Journal of Defense Studies. 4 (2): 36–49.
- Smith, Ivian C.; West, Nigel (2012). Historical Dictionary of Chinese Intelligence. Lanham: Scarecrow Press. ISBN 978-0-8108-7174-8.
- Stokes, Mark A.; Lin, Jenny; Hsiao, L. C. Russell (2011). The Chinese People's Liberation Army Signals Intelligence and Cyber Reconnaissance Infrastructure (PDF). Project 2049 Institute.
- Wortzel, Larry (2014). Chinese People's Liberation Army and Information Warfare. Carlisle Barracks, PA: United States Army War College Press. ISBN 978-1-58487-608-3.
