= Cloud workload protection platform =

Computer program for information security

A cloud workload protection platform (CWPP) is a computer security software aimed at securing (potentially virtual) computer machines. CWPPs are usually agent-based, meaning that a software agent is running permanently within the machine to be protected, collecting security-relevant data and events and sending those to a cloud-based service. The cloud-based service monitors all the machines under its supervision, derives alerts and notifies users about corresponding potential security threats.

Gartner maintains a list of CWPP vendor-based solutions.
