= Wim van Eck =

Security researcher

Wim van Eck is a Dutch computer researcher who was the first to publish about the vulnerability of displays to electromagnetic eavesdropping in 1985, a technique later named after his pioneering research as Van Eck phreaking.

== Life and education ==
Van Eck was born in Zeist, Netherlands. He graduated from the Twente University of Technology in 1981 with a thesis on "Automatic On-Line Exercise Electrocardiography in Patients Unable to Perform Leg Exercise." After graduating, he became a member of the Bio-engineering Group within the Electronics Department at the university.

In January 1982, he joined the Propagation and Electromagnetic Compatibility Department at the laboratories of the former state company Netherlands PTT, a telecommunication, telegraphy, and mail provider. There, he was in charge of several EMC research projects, ranging from NEMP protection to the emission and susceptibility aspects of telecommunications equipment.

In 1985, Van Eck published the first open reports about the dangers of eavesdropping on displays in the Computers & Security journal, which became openly discussed as Van Eck's "phenomenon" in the popular press and was followed up by contributions from different researchers and multiple supplementary reports by the journal.

== Popular culture ==
- Numb3rs: Episode 11, Season 1 "Sacrifice" as inventor of Van Eck phreacking
