= SIGTOT =

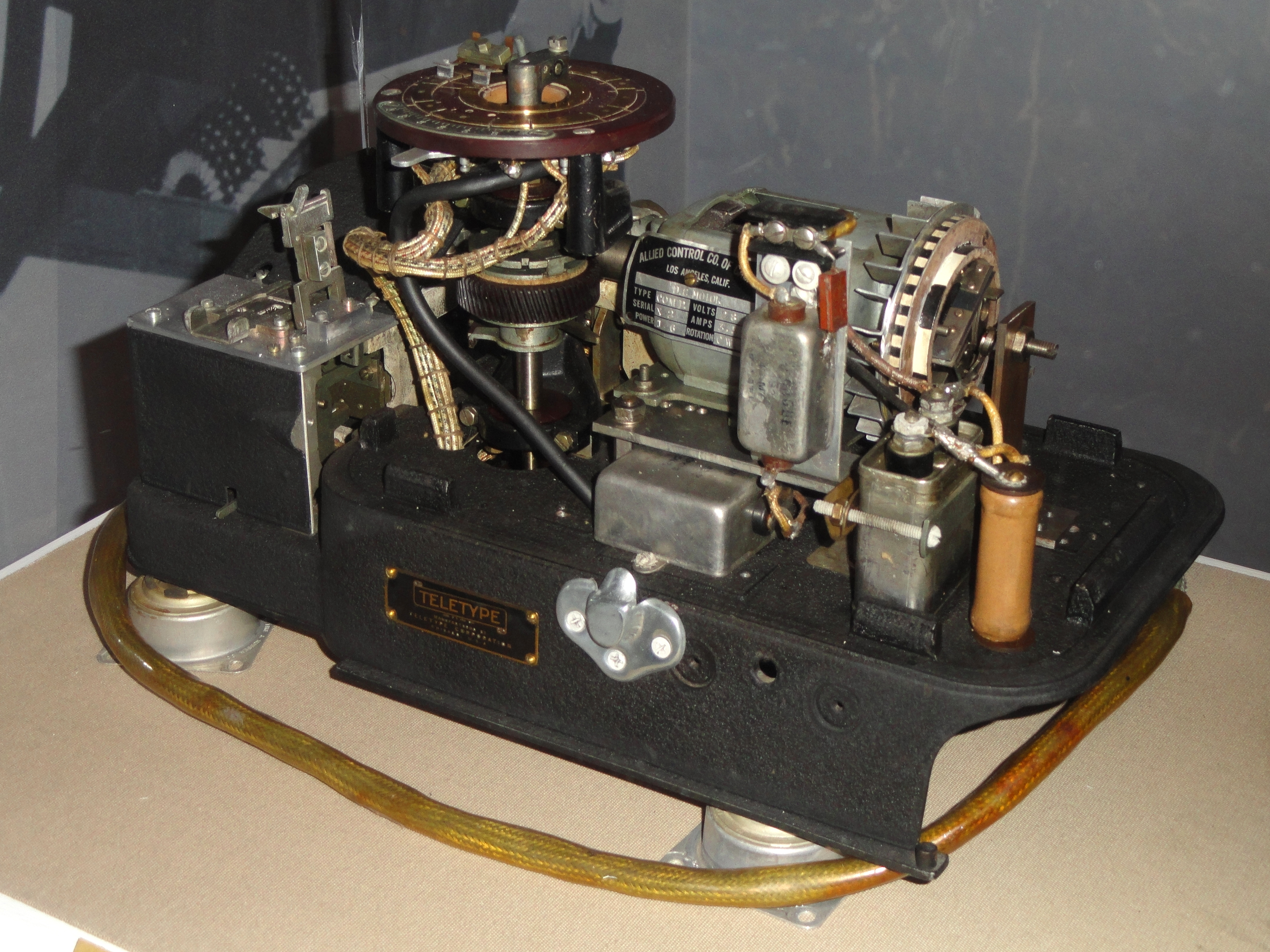
Special paper tape reader (transmitter distributor) used with SIGTOT

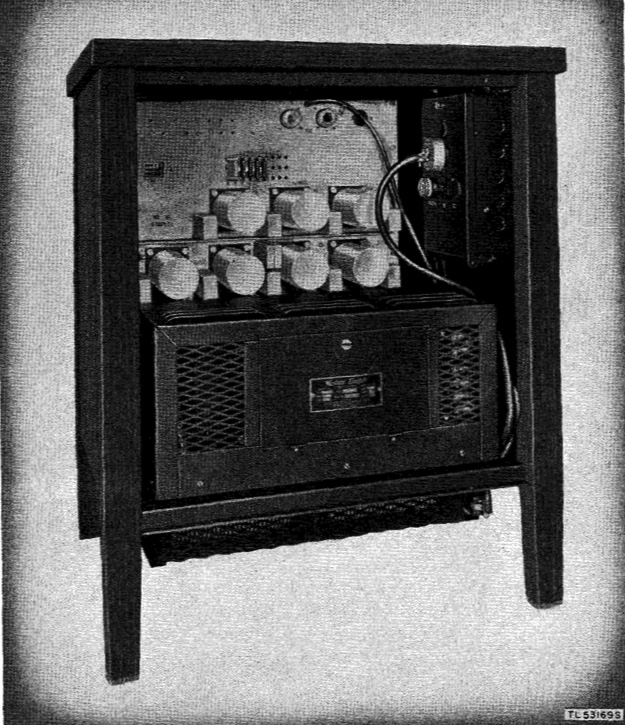
Bell Telephone 131B2 mixer used to combine (xor) one time-tape with teleprinter signals

SIGTOT was a one-time tape machine for encrypting teleprinter communication that was used by the United States during World War II and after for the most sensitive message traffic. It was developed after security flaws were discovered in an earlier rotor machine for the same purpose, called SIGCUM. SIGTOT was designed by Leo Rosen and used the same Bell Telephone 132B2 mixer as SIGCUM. The British developed a similar machine called the 5-UCO. Later an improved mixer, the SSM-33, replaced the 131B2.

The phenomenon, codenamed TEMPEST, of sensitive information leaking by way of unintended electromagnetic radiation for the circuits used inside encryption machine was first discovered coming from the 131B2 mixers used in SIGTOT.

SIGTOT required large amounts of key tape to operate on a continual basis, which was needed for traffic flow security. In 1955, NSA produced some 1,660,000 rolls of one time tape. The logistical problems involved in the generation, supply and destruction of sufficient quantities of key tape limited its use to only the most sensitive traffic. In the 1950s. the U.S. Army Security Agency began developing a replacement, an effort later taken over by the newly formed National Security Agency and resulting in the fielding of the KW-26 (ROMULUS) system.
