= Fourth Department of the General Staff Department =

Chinese military unit

The Fourth Department (4PLA) of the Chinese People's Liberation Army General Staff Department (GSD) is also known as the Electronic Countermeasures and Radar Department. It was charged with the Chinese People's Liberation Army's offensive electronic warfare (EW) and information warfare (IW) missions, to include offensive cyber operations. In 2016, its functions were transferred to the Network Systems Department of the PLA Strategic Support Force.

== History ==
During the Sino-Soviet conflict in 1969, the Chinese military experienced repeated disruptions of their communication networks, impeding command and control (C2) of their combat units. This experience resulted in the conclusion that China's C2 infrastructure could not survive a conflict with a technically advanced enemy. This conclusion led to a three-phased approach to upgrading and advancing China's C2 infrastructure. The third phase of this modernization effort, the development of electronic countermeasures for C2 infrastructure, continues today and is the responsibility of 4PLA. The exact year that 4PLA was founded is not agreed upon by publicly available sources. One website indicates that 4PLA was established in 1982 for EW and counter-EW. Another website on Major General Yao Hong Zhang may indicate that 4PLA existed or was being created in 1989 when he was transferred there. Multiple sources, however, indicate that 4PLA was established in 1990 as an EW entity. A 1990 establishment falls in line with the international conflicts and activities that shaped PLA IW doctrine, specifically the first Gulf War.

The PLA's observations of U.S. information operations in the Balkans and in the first Gulf War resulted in contemplation and reflection regarding China's doctrine and adaptation to IW, which the PLA saw as a "new battlespace". The PLA referred specifically to the Gulf War as “the great transformation.” The effect of modern IW on operations and international strategy was clear to the PLA, and it began to establish organizations, strategies, and doctrine to address this new type of warfare. The PLA understood as early as 1991 that future conflicts would heavily involve technology and electronics. The establishment of 4PLA and its growth supported the development of the PLA's IW capabilities. In 1993, the PLA made revisions to the Central Military Commission's Military Strategic Guidelines, stating that the PLA should prepare to "fight local wars under informationized conditions," and as early as 1996, major joint exercises included EW units.

The PLA spent the years following the Gulf War studying military publications on IW from around the world, which eventually resulted in the PLA's own IW doctrine that it tasked the 4PLA to implement. 4PLA is believed to have been in direct control of traditional jamming and offensive EW operations since its inception, but it is unknown when 4PLA took on its IW responsibilities. 4PLA has overseen the PLA's IW operations since at least 1999, when Major General Dai Qingmin produced a major work outlining an IW doctrine that he called Integrated Network Electronic Warfare (INEW). His publication was reviewed by 4PLA, indicating that 4PLA was in charge of IW oversight at this time. In 2000, Dai was promoted to the head of 4PLA, likely demonstrating the GSD's endorsement of the INEW strategy and consolidating the IW mission in 4PLA. Bryan Krekel, in his book Occupying the Information High Ground, writes that 4PLA had to fight for this authority, citing a February 2002 issue of China Military Science where the heads of the Third Department of the GSD (3PLA) and 4PLA each made their cases for operational control of IW. Dai's INEW strategy won the debate, and subsequently, IW responsibilities were consolidated in 4PLA.

In 2016, as part of military reforms in the PLA, the General Staff Department was abolished. The Fourth Department's functions were likely transferred to the Network Systems Department of the PLA Strategic Support Force.

== Major General Dai Qingmin and Integrated Network Electronic Warfare (INEW) ==
Major General Dai Qingmin was the head of 4PLA for approximately five years starting in 2000. Prior to joining 4PLA leadership, Dai was the head of the PLA Electronic Engineering Academy, 4PLA's primary training institution. His rise to the head of 4PLA is attributed to his seminal work on INEW, Introduction to Information Warfare. Soon after the release of this publication, Dai was promoted to the head of 4PLA. Subsequent articles included An Introduction to Integrated Network Electronic Warfare, which Dai published in 2002. The GSD's decision to promote Dai is largely believed to be an endorsement of the INEW strategy.

In terms of his ideology, Dai sees CNO and EW as principle forms of IW with information superiority as the ultimate goal. Dai indicates that specific IW operations include jamming or sabotaging an enemy's information or information systems, sabotaging an enemy's overall information operation structure, and blinding and deafening the enemy through IW measures. For Dai, the integration of military and civilian IW fighting forces and integration of soft, hard, offensive, and defensive forces are crucial. An important aspect of Dai's doctrine is the combination of both IW and kinetic strikes:

After the information attack succeeds in suppressing the enemy, the enemy's plight of temporary ‘blindness, deafness, and even paralysis' can be exploited for quick organization of an ‘information/firepower' assault.

Dai's vision is destructive and disruptive in nature, calling for the destruction and control of the enemy's information infrastructure.

While Dai is the major author of INEW doctrine, the strategy stems from both U.S. and Soviet IW doctrine. During the Cold War, the Soviet Union had a doctrine called Radio-Electronic Combat (REC), which the U.S. Army describes as "the total integration of electronic warfare and physical destruction resources to deny us the use of our electronic systems." Multiple authors call INEW “REC on steroids.” This is because INEW adds additional dimensions to REC, specifically INEW moves beyond the tactical and theater realms of operations where REC was applied by elevating the INEW doctrine to a strategic level of war. Additionally, INEW adds cyber attacks and kinetic attacks on satellites to the REC doctrine. INEW also implements U.S. IW strategy from the AirLand Battle doctrine, the U.S. response to REC that integrated airpower, special operations forces, artillery, armor, and EW. Additionally, INEW implements lessons learned from U.S. information operations in Kosovo, the Balkans, and Iraq. Lessons learned from these U.S. military engagements may have influenced China's decision to apply IW doctrine at the strategic war level.

INEW integrates the use of “EW, CNO, and limited kinetic strikes against key command, control, communication, and computer nodes to disrupt the enemy's battlefield network information systems.” CNO include computer network attack, defense, and exploitation. Aligning with Dai's ideology, INEW unites offensive and defensive IW under a single authority, specifically 4PLA. One of the most important aspects of INEW is that it integrates IW into larger PLA operations, calling for kinetic attacks that make use of opportunities created by IW operations, as Dai discussed above. For example, INEW doctrine combines precision strikes and IW operations, likely targeting command, control, communications, computer, intelligence, surveillance, and reconnaissance (C4ISR) targets in line with INEW doctrine. INEW applies a variety of methods, to include the disruption and destruction of systems, creation of false realities through falsified information, electronic jamming, deception, and suppression, computer network attacks, computer intrusions to sabotage information processing, and impeding information transmissions.

The goal of INEW is to weaken and/or paralyze an opponent's decision-making capabilities and the political, economic, and military components of the enemy's war infrastructure. To do this, INEW doctrine calls for IW operations to seize control of opponent's information flows and maintain information dominance during campaigns. IW operations also aim to achieve information dominance that would result in denying the opponent access to information that is vital to continuing the conflict. This dominance should be maintained throughout conflicts. INEW continues to be the dominant doctrinal core of PLA IW operations today, with 4PLA likely in the authoritative position to implement this strategy.

== Responsibilities ==
4PLA has a range of responsibilities within the IW realm. 4PLA is the main entity that conducts EW, including offensive EW, the destruction of enemy information systems, and computer network attacks and penetrations. 4PLA is also responsible for the collection of electronic intelligence (ELINT), although it is unclear whether or not 4PLA is also in charge of ELINT analysis, since what happens to information once 4PLA collects it is relatively unknown. ELINT collection responsibilities include space-based photoreconnaissance, ELINT operations in conjunction with the PLA, PLA Air Force (PLAAF), and PLA Navy (PLAN), some military intelligence and counterintelligence efforts, and the collection and cataloguing of exploits and weaknesses in enemies' military infrastructure. 4PLA is also in charge of electronic countermeasures, including developing radar and electronic countermeasure capabilities, electronic counter-countermeasures, and jamming and counter-jamming capabilities.

On a strategic level, 4PLA coordinates the PLA's EW and IW doctrine and strategy, including implementing INEW. There is debate as to what 4PLA's defensive responsibilities are. Multiple writings on the PLA indicate that 4PLA is responsible for the defense of strategic targets, indicating that the PLA command bunkers in the Western Hills of Beijing are a strategic target that they defend, but 3PLA is also identified as the entity in charge of computer network defense. It is possible that these sources are incorrect, this information is not publicly known, 3PLA and 4PLA share these responsibilities, or that there are different aspects of defense that are divided between 3PLA and 4PLA. You Ji, in his book The Armed Forces of China, writes that 4PLA identified three tasks for improving the PLA's C2 infrastructure's ability to conduct EW, indicating that 4PLA may be responsible for assessing China's EW capabilities as well as the execution of EW. In addition to its operational responsibilities, 4PLA also conducts research and development (R&D) on technology related to EW and IW. These programs will be discussed more below. Subsequently, these responsibilities support 4PLA's ultimate goals of information superiority, the disruption of information control capabilities, the maintenance of China's information systems and capabilities, and the weakening of the enemy's ability to acquire, transmit, process, and use information during conflicts.

== Organization ==
4PLA is organized under the GSD, a military component of the Central Military Commission (CMC) that oversees the GSD's operations. The GSD organizes and directs PLA military units across China, including planning, training, and organizing armed forces. The military intelligence services under the GSD, including the Second Department (2PLA) in charge of collecting military intelligence, 3PLA, and 4PLA, compose China's only all source intelligence organization. The exact organization of 4PLA is not publicly known. Although, some components of its organization include operational electronic countermeasure units, some of which are integrated within military region organizations. Additionally, 4PLA oversees or has relationships with multiple R&D institutions that focus on offensive IW technologies and related research. In terms of 4PLA leadership, Dai is the most well known and frequently mentioned leader of 4PLA. 4PLA directors and political commissars, like other GSD department heads, are likely equivalent in rank to a Group Army Commander.

In his book, James Mulvenon mentions the Joint Campaign Command Headquarters, which may take wartime responsibilities from 4PLA and may be organized into multiple “centers” that would direct and coordinate IW operations. These centers include comprehensive planning, electronic countermeasures, network warfare, information system defense, information security and secrecy, weapons and equipment support, and comprehensive support. One of the centers that Mulvenon mentions in detail is the Information Countermeasures Center, which he suggests 4PLA would have some involvement in. This center is composed of members from relevant services, likely including 4PLA. The center is responsible for providing advice, planning, and coordinating IW and countermeasure operations. Mulvenon states that personnel from 4PLA would be “trigger pullers” at the national and warzone levels of conflicts in this command structure. This command structure would only be applied during wartime, however, and information on the command structure during peacetime is not publicly available.

== 4PLA relationships with other organizations ==
4PLA appears to have a variety of relationships with other Chinese entities, including other military units, research institutes, and the private sector. 4PLA has counterparts in the military theater commands, the PLAGF, PLAN, PLAAF, and PLARF, all of which have at least one electronic countermeasures regiment that 4PLA oversees and/or staffs. Additionally,

- Technical reconnaissance bureaus (TRBs): The PLA has at least six TRBs located in the Lanzhou, Jinan, Chengdu, Guangzhou, and Beijing military regions. These TRBs have some signal intelligence (SIGINT) and CNO responsibilities, but their exact responsibilities and command structure are not public. It is possible that, due to the overlapping aspects of their duties, 4PLA has some interactions with the TRBs.
- Information warfare militias: Reports of IW militias began as early as 1998 with press reports on an experimental IW militia in Datong City. This report said that a state-owned Chinese enterprise recruited forty personnel from universities, scientific research institutions, and other facilities for the purpose of developing radar jamming and communication disruption capabilities. By 2006, at least thirty-three more IW Militia units were established across China, similarly recruiting from universities, research institutions, and the private sector. A March 2008 PLA announcement indicated that a new IW Militia unit was established in Yongning that had computer network warfare, data processing and collection, network warfare research and training, and network defense responsibilities, displaying an overlap with 4PLA's mission. The Yongning unit's website indicates that it is tasked to “attack the enemy's wartime networks." Similar to TRBs, there is little public information regarding the command structures for these IW militias or the role that 4PLA plays in their structure. One article on the Guangzhou Garrison IW militia mentions input on training documents from an unspecified “electronic countermeasures regiment,” that Deepak Sharma, author of “Integrated Network Electronic Warfare,” suspects may refer to the 4PLA. This connection could indicate that 4PLA may interact to an unknown degree with IW Militias.
- 54th Research Institute in Hebei: 4PLA directly oversees the 54th Research Institute in Hebei. This institute conducts research and provides engineering support to 4PLA. Activities at this institute include developing digital ELINT signal processors to analyze parameters of radar pulses, forming joint ventures with private companies, and maintaining a close relationship with China Electronic Technology Corporation (CETC) entities. In a report by James Mulvenon and Thomas Bickford, the authors indicate that 4PLA may operate the China Electronic Systems Engineering Company. They described the company as "key to PLA telecommunications, with interests ranging from mobile communications to encryption, microwaves, computer applications, and dedicated military C4I systems."
- Other research institutes: 4PLA maintains relationships with several other research institutes. Nigel West and I. C. Smith's book, Historical Dictionary: Chinese Intelligence, notes that 4PLA worked with the Louyang Institute of Tracking, Telemetry, and Telecommunication to develop a space tracking system. The same book indicates that 4PLA has some responsibilities related to unmanned aerial vehicles and worked with the Peking University's Unmanned Flight Vehicle Design Institute and Institute of Unmanned Aircraft. It is important to notice, however, the absence of this 4PLA responsibility in other available sources. The Ministry of Electronic Industry (MEI) has at least two research institutions that maintain a relationship with 4PLA: the MEI's 17th Research Institute in Nanjing that researches phased-array radar and the MEI's 36th Research Institute in Anhui, which is also called the East China Research Institute of Electronic Engineering.
- Southwest Institute of Electronic Equipment (SWIEE): An important relationship exists between 4PLA and the 29th Research Institute in Chengdu, which is also called SWIEE. Together SWIEE and the 54th Research Institute undertake a large portion of 4PLA's research needs. Engineers at SWIEE have conducted studies on jamming synthetic aperture radar on reconnaissance satellites. SWIEE is also in charge of radar jamming station development. It is believed to be in charge of more than 25 ELINT receivers. Although SWIEE is responsible for these receivers, it is unclear who mans them and how the information is passed to 4PLA.
- Electronic Engineering Academy: 4PLA training primarily occurs at the PLA's Electronic Engineering Academy in Hefei, which is the PLA's primary academic and training center for EW.
- Other training facilities: Additional training may take place at the PLA's Science and Engineering University, Information Engineering University, and Wuhan Communications Command Academy. The Science and Engineering University provides advanced IW and network training. It also conducts research in scientific, technological, and military defense. The Information Engineering University trains personnel in technical fields, including information systems, information security, and IW. Wuhan Communications Command Academy (CCA) is a senior professional military education institute that educates personnel in communications and electronics. Based on the establishment of the PLA's first IW simulation experiment center at CCA in 1998, this institute appears closely aligned with the IW mission.
- 4PLA and private companies: The 4PLA has relationships with private companies, including joint ventures through its research institutes, help with personnel, and some unclear relationships. In an effort to improve PLA technology, MEI setup several joint ventures between SWIEE, MEI's 36th Research Institute, and multiple Israel-based companies. MEI called this program "Project 63". While these joint ventures and other programs like them form a relationship between 4PLA and the private sector, the main relationship appears to be in terms of personnel. The PLA has incorporated people from the commercial industry, academia, and possible some hacker communities to meet personnel requirements for IW. Although not explicitly stated, 4PLA's relation to IW likely indicates that it benefits from these personnel acquisition programs. Additionally, 4PLA appears to have an R&D relationship with the China Electronic Technology Corporation, but the exact nature of this relationship is not publicly available. Other available texts indicate that the PLA and PLA intelligence organizations have “become involved in the corporate sector" and the "Chinese private sector will continue to play a crucial role in securing cyberspace," possibly indicating that 4PLA has more relationships with the private sector that are not publicized.
- Third Department of the General Staff Department (3PLA): 4PLA and 3PLA are related due to their similar missions and overlapping responsibilities. 3PLA is a SIGINT organization that is in charge of the PLA's computer network defense and espionage missions. It oversees an extensive network of SIGINT stations throughout China that collect and process intelligence. 3PLA has a large staff of linguists and technicians and is the largest Chinese intelligence agency. Subsequently, 3PLA and 4PLA are the two largest players in China's CNO. They share several responsibilities: cyber intelligence collection, R&D on information security, and the joint management of network attack and defense training systems. 4PLA's offensive mission is the key differentiator between 3PLA and 4PLA. The INEW doctrine consolidates this offensive mission under 4PLA, while 3PLA is left responsible for intelligence gathering and network defense. The personnel at 3PLA are also a key differentiator, since there is no indication that 4PLA has the analysis capabilities that 3PLA possesses, suggesting that 3PLA may analyze and exploit the cyber information that 4PLA gathers in their offensive missions. One interesting point is the importance of understanding adversary's “red lines” when conducting offensive IW actions to avoid unintended escalation, including assessments on how dependent opponents are on a single network node or a specific network. 3PLA or another PLA intelligence organization may provide these assessments and inform 4PLA operations.

== Order of battle ==
There is little available information on 4PLA's size and location, but a Project 2049 white paper provides some insight. The white paper indicates that 4PLA has at least four bureaus, one brigade, and two regiments. Additionally, the white paper explains that operational 4PLA units, including an electronic countermeasures brigade, are headquartered in Langfang in the Hebei Province, with subordinate battalion-level entities in Anhui, Jiangxi, Shandong and “other locations in China.” The white paper also identifies at least two 4PLA units on Hainan Island. One of these units appears to be responsible for jamming U.S. satellite assets. Another regimental-level unit on the island may also have satellite jamming responsibilities, but it is unclear if these responsibilities are operational or experimental.

== Application ==
4PLA is in charge of offensive IW, which China is interested in developing and using for a variety of reasons. IW is inexpensive, is currently available to the PLA, does not require an invasion or use of other kinetic assets, has a reasonable level of deniability, exploits U.S. dependency on information systems, and can deter U.S. response and/or degrade U.S. deployments. Using IW, China can also strike at the U.S. homeland, which is beyond the range of most conventional weapons. To carry out IW operations, however, the PLA and 4PLA will need to prepare the battlespace ahead of time, likely during times of peace. Cyber reconnaissance missions by 4PLA or 3PLA during peacetime can identify information system nodes and critical infrastructure to target during conflict. One PLA publication, Information Confrontation Theory, suggests that IW forces, like 4PLA, could plant malicious software in enemy systems or other information systems that would remain dormant until employed. These operations would allow the PLA to prepare for future IW operations.

Available Chinese IW doctrine strongly indicates that IW operations will be executed at the opening phase of conflicts. Some publications go so far as to say that IW cannot be effective unless carried out in the first phase of a conflict and identify early establishment of information dominance as one of the highest operational priorities in a conflict, a strategic goal that is supported by the INEW doctrine. Additionally, the PLA plans to use IW to achieve information dominance as quickly as possible, as opposed to using IW operations as a force multiplier during subsequent phases of a conflict. Although Chinese IW doctrine does not suggest the PLA will use IW as a force multiplier, it does suggest that IW operations will be conducted throughout conflicts and not only in the opening phase, likely to retain information dominance. Additionally, the PLA may use IW in a pre-emptive strike, especially against the U.S., since the Chinese military is inferior in terms of strength. The PLA may execute this pre-emptive strike so that it does not lose the initiative, which may be difficult or impossible to regain if the stronger military force, the U.S., gains the initiative in a conflict. The PLA also sees IW campaigns as operations that do not require conventional military action, possibly indicating that a pre-emptive strike may not result in a kinetic conflict unless it crosses an adversary's red line. This strike may instead be a deterrence mechanism.

Writings on China's IW strategy identify a range of both military and civilian targets for IW operations. Military targets include C4ISR, logistics, and direct military targets, or any targets that can prevent the opponent, and specifically the U.S. military, from operating or intervening in a conflict in the Pacific and targets that can degrade U.S. capabilities. C4ISR infrastructure and logistics networks are seen by the PLA as U.S. strategic centers of gravity. C4ISR targets include "the enemy's information detection sources, information channels, and information-processing and decision making systems." A 2007 book published by the PLA, Informationized Joint Operations, indicates that C2 networks and logistics systems would be among the first entities targeted by INEW forces, which likely means 4PLA. One PLA strategy is referred to by Northrop Grumman as “strike the enemy's nodes to destroy his network.” This strategy directs the PLA to target the adversary's C4ISR and logistics networks and then exploit the resulting “blindness” with traditional kinetic force.

Logistics targets for IW operations include U.S. NAVSTAR GPS, airborne early warning platforms, satellites, and American military networks, such as the Joint Tactical Information Distribution System and the Non-secure Internet Protocol Router Network (NIPRNET). By targeting logistics networks using IW forces like 4PLA, the PLA could delay resupply by misdirecting supply vehicles, corrupt or delete inventory files, or otherwise hindering the opponent's logistics capabilities. NIPRNET would likely be a high priority target for PLA IW operations. NIPRNET contains and transmits critical deployment information, including time-phased force deployment lists (TPFDLs). It is vital to logistical, personnel, and unit movements, and some writers believe that Chinese forces have already penetrated and mapped out this network, likely supporting future exploitation of NIPRNET, possibly during conflict. By targeting NIPRNET, the PLA could degrade and/or slow down U.S. deployment long enough to achieve campaign objectives before the U.S. can respond.

It is probable that IW operations against military targets will occur in parallel with kinetic operations against military targets, such as warships, aircraft, and supply craft that would exploit the temporary blindness and/or confusion caused by IW operations. Simultaneous operations could be conducted on all domains at the same time, including ground, air, sea, space, and electromagnetic. Identified civilian targets include IW operations against civilian communications systems, power grids, production lines, water utilities, chemical plants, telecommunications, and transportation entities that could directly affect both civilians and military personnel. Successful IW operations targeting these entities would bring a conflict to the American homeland, which could impact U.S. support of a conflict and the willingness of the American people to support a war or get involved in a conflict.

In terms of the goals of IW operations, China's IW doctrine focuses on disruption and paralysis, not destruction, meaning that the PLA may manipulate and collect data or shut down networks, but they are unlikely to destroy this data or destroy target systems in IW operations, unless these operations are in conjunction with conventional military operations. Mulvenon provides this quote that outlines the goals of PLA IW operations:

We must as far as possible seal up the enemies' eyes and ears, and make them become blind and deaf, and we must as far as possible confuse the minds of their commanders and turn them into madmen, using this to achieve our own victory.

Additional IW goals include raising the cost of a conflict to an unacceptable level, preventing or disrupting the acquisition, processing, or transmission of information in support of decision making or combat operations, and providing opportunities that can be exploited using kinetic strikes. Some writings on Chinese IW operations indicate that the goals of some IW operations may be deterrence. One report by Northrop Grumman indicates that IW deterrence, specifically through cyber network attack, a 4PLA responsibility, is a deterrence mechanism second only to nuclear deterrence. Similar to pre-emptive strikes, these IW operations may lack subsequent kinetic actions.

== Bibliography ==
=== Books ===
- Ji, You (1999). The Armed Forces of China. New York: I.B. Tauris. ISBN 978-1-86064-487-0.
- Shambaugh, David (2002). Modernizing China's Military. Berkeley: University of California Press. ISBN 978-0-520-22507-7.
- Smith, Ivian C.; West, Nigel (2012). Historical Dictionary of Chinese Intelligence. Lanham: Scarecrow Press. ISBN 978-0-8108-7174-8.
- Wortzel, Larry (2014). Chinese People's Liberation Army and Information Warfare. Carlisle Barracks, PA: United States Army War College Press. ISBN 978-1-58487-608-3.
- Xuezhi, Guo (2012). China's Security State: Philosophy, Evolution, and Politics. Cambridge: Cambridge University Press. ISBN 978-1-139-53681-3.
- Krekel, Bryan; Adams, Patton; Bakos, George (March 8, 2012). Occupying the Information High Ground: Chinese Capabilities for Computer Network Operations and Cyber Espionage (PDF). Northrop Grumman/United States-China Economic and Security Review Commission. ISBN 978-1-4751-2722-5.
- Stokes, Mark (1999). China's Strategic Modernization: Implications for the United States. Strategic Studies Institute. ISBN 978-1-4289-1197-0.
- Krekel, Bryan (2009). Capability of the People's Republic of China to Conduct Cyber Warfare and Computer Network Exploitation (PDF). McLean, VA: Northrop Grumman/United States-China Economic and Security Review Commission. ISBN 978-1-4379-4285-9.
- Mulvenon, James (2009). "PLA Computer Network Operations: Scenarios, Doctrine, Organizations, and Capability". In Kamphausen, Roy; Lai, David; Scobell, Andrew (eds.). Beyond the Strait: PLA Missions Other Than Taiwan. Strategic Studies Institute. pp. 253–285.
- Stokes, Mark A.; Lin, Jenny; Hsiao, L. C. Russell (2011). The Chinese People's Liberation Army Signals Intelligence and Cyber Reconnaissance Infrastructure (PDF). Project 2049 Institute.
- Thomas, Timothy L. (2007). Decoding the Virtual Dragon. Fort Leavenworth, KS: Foreign Military Studies Office.
- Mulvenon, James; Bickford, Thomas (1999). "The PLA and the Telecommunications Industry in China". In Mulvenon, James; Yang, Richard H. (eds.). The People's Liberation Army in the Information Age. Washington, DC: RAND Corporation. pp. 245=257. ISBN 978-0-8330-2716-0.

=== Journals ===
- Fritz, Jason (October 2008). "How China Will Use Cyber Warfare to Leapfrog in Military Competitiveness". Culture Mandala. 8 (1): 28–80. CiteSeerX 10.1.1.352.3753.
- Sharma, Deepak (April 2010). "Integrated Network Electronic Warfare: China's New Concept of Information Warfare" (PDF). Journal of Defense Studies. 4 (2): 36–49.
- Prakash, Rahul (March 2013). "China and Cyberspace" (PDF). ORF Issue Brief (52). Observer Research Foundation.
- Mattis, Peter (September 2012). "The Analytic Challenge of Understanding Chinese Intelligence Services" (PDF). Studies in Intelligence. 56 (3): 47–57.
- Feakin, Tobias (June 2013). "Enter the Cyber Dragon: Understanding Chinese Intelligence Agencies' Cyber Capabilities" (PDF). Australian Strategic Policy Institute (50).
- Wortzel, Larry (August 2012). "Assessing the Chinese Cyber Threat" (PDF). Defense Dossier (4): 1–6.

=== Reports ===
- Office of the Secretary of Defense (2013). Annual Report to Congress: Military and Security Developments Involving the People's Republic of China (PDF) (Report). Department of Defense. Archived from the original (PDF) on September 20, 2018.
