= Radiation intelligence =

Unintentional Radiation intelligence, or RINT, is military intelligence gathered and produced from unintentional radiation created as induction from electrical wiring, usually of computers, data connections and electricity networks.

== See also ==
- TEMPEST
