= Anti-keylogger =

An anti-keylogger (or anti–keystroke logger) is a type of software specifically designed for the detection of keystroke logger software; often, such software will also incorporate the ability to delete or at least immobilize hidden keystroke logger software on a computer. In comparison to most anti-virus or anti-spyware software, the primary difference is that an anti-keylogger does not make a distinction between a legitimate keystroke-logging program and an illegitimate keystroke-logging program (such as malware); all keystroke-logging programs are flagged and optionally removed, whether they appear to be legitimate keystroke-logging software or not. The anti-keylogger is efficient in managing malicious users. It can detect the keyloggers and terminate them from the system.

== Use of anti-keyloggers ==
Keyloggers are sometimes part of malware packages downloaded onto computers without the owners' knowledge. Detecting the presence of a keylogger on a computer can be difficult. So-called anti- keylogging programs have been developed to thwart keylogging systems, and these are often effective when used properly.

Anti-keyloggers are used both by large organizations as well as individuals in order to scan for and remove (or in some cases simply immobilize) keystroke logging software on a computer. It is generally advised the software developers that anti-keylogging scans be run on a regular basis in order to reduce the amount of time during which a keylogger may record keystrokes. For example, if a system is scanned once every three days, there is a maximum of only three days during which a keylogger could be hidden on the system and recording keystrokes.

=== Public computers ===
Public computers are extremely susceptible to the installation of keystroke logging software and hardware, and there are documented instances of this occurring. Public computers are particularly susceptible to keyloggers because any number of people can gain access to the machine and install both a hardware keylogger and a software keylogger, either or both of which can be secretly installed in a matter of minutes. Anti-keyloggers are often used on a daily basis to ensure that public computers are not infected with keyloggers, and are safe for public use.

=== Gaming usage ===
Keyloggers have been prevalent in the online gaming industry, being used to secretly record a gamer's access credentials, user name and password, when logging into an account; this information is sent back to the hacker. The hacker can sign on later to the account and change the password to the account, thus stealing it.

World of Warcraft has been of particular importance to game hackers and has been the target of numerous keylogging viruses. Anti-keyloggers are used by many World of Warcraft and other gaming community members in order to try to keep their gaming accounts secure.

=== Financial institutions ===
Financial institutions have become the target of keyloggers, particularly those institutions which do not use advanced security features such as PIN pads or screen keyboards. Anti-keyloggers are used to run regular scans of any computer on which banking or client information is accessed, protecting passwords, banking information, and credit card numbers from identity thieves.

=== Personal use ===
The most common use of an anti-keylogger is by individuals wishing to protect their privacy while using their computer; uses range from protecting financial information used in online banking, any passwords, personal communication, and virtually any other information which may be typed into a computer. Keyloggers are often installed by people known by the computer's owner, and many times have been installed by an ex-partner hoping to spy on their ex-partner's activities, particularly chat.

== Types ==
=== Signature-based ===
This type of software has a signature base, that is strategic information that helps to uniquely identify a keylogger, and the list contains as many known keyloggers as possible. Some vendors make some effort or availability of an up-to-date listing for download by customers. Each time a 'System Scan' is run, this software compares the contents of the hard disk drive, item by item, against the list, looking for any matches.

This type of software is a rather widespread one, but it has its own drawbacks The biggest drawback of signature-based anti-keyloggers is that one can only be protected from keyloggers found on the signature-base list, thus staying vulnerable to unknown or unrecognized keyloggers. A criminal can download one of many famous keyloggers, change it just enough, and the anti-keylogger won't recognize it.

=== Heuristic analysis ===
This software doesn't use signature bases, it uses a checklist of known features, attributes, and methods that keyloggers are known to use.

It analyzes the methods of work of all the modules in a PC, thus blocking the activity of any module that is similar to the work of keyloggers. Though this method gives better keylogging protection than signature-based anti-keyloggers, it has its own drawbacks. One of them is that this type of software blocks non-keyloggers also. Several 'non-harmful' software modules, either part of the operating system or part of legitimate apps, use processes which keyloggers also use, which can trigger a false positive. Usually all the non signature-based keyloggers have the option to allow the user to unblock selected modules, but this can cause difficulties for inexperienced users who are unable to discern good modules from bad modules when manually choosing to block or unblock.

== See also ==
- Keystroke logger
- Hardware keylogger
