= Eavesdropping =

Act of secretly listening to the private conversation of others

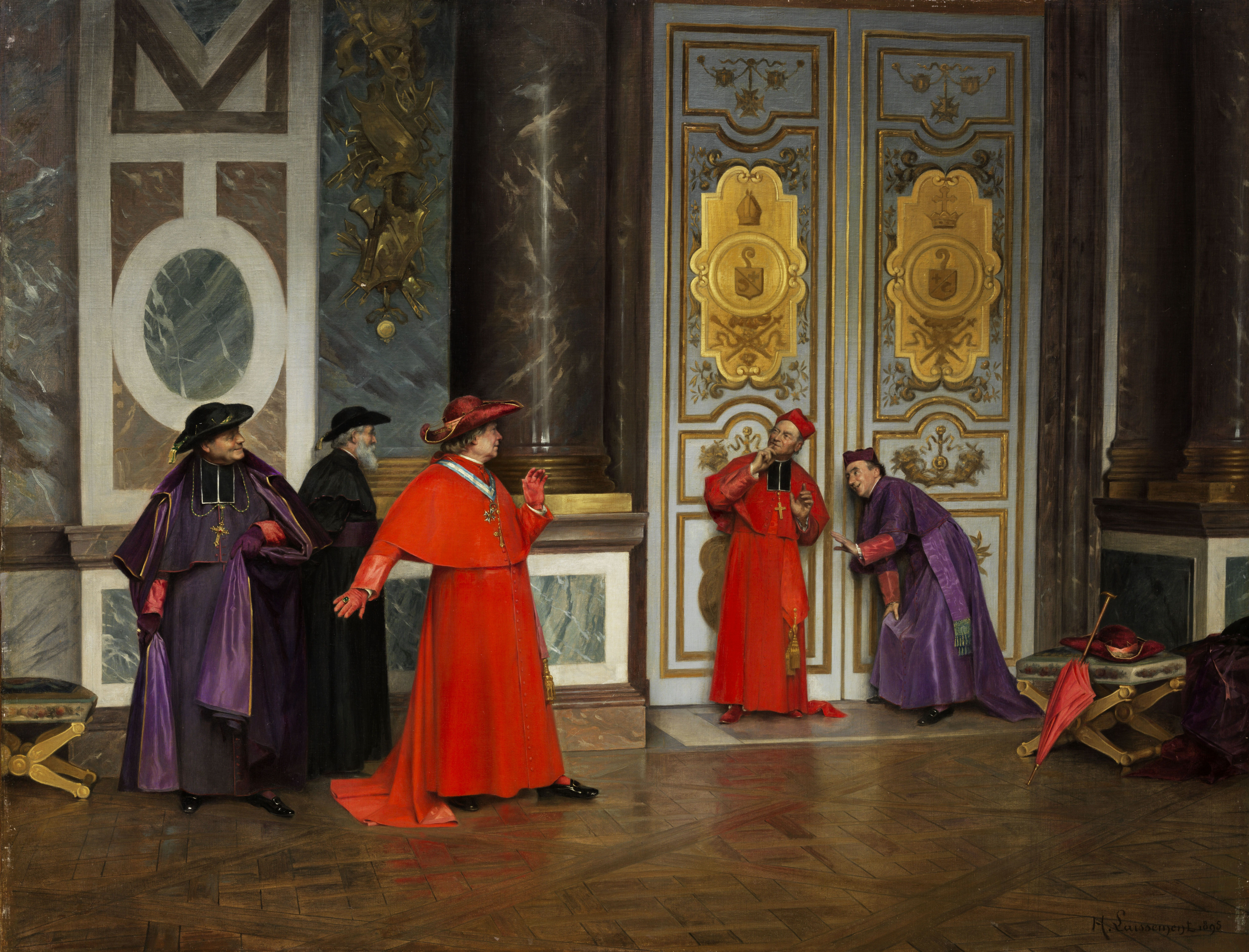
Cardinals eavesdropping in the Vatican. A painting by Henri Adolphe Laissement, 1895

Eavesdropping is the act of secretly or stealthily listening to the private conversation or communications of others without their consent in order to gather information.

== Etymology ==
The verb eavesdrop is a back-formation from the noun eavesdropper ("a person who eavesdrops"), which was formed from the related noun eavesdrop ("the dripping of water from the eaves of a house; the ground on which such water falls").

An eavesdropper was someone who would stand under the eave of a building and close to the wall so as to hear what is said within. The PBS documentaries Inside the Court of Henry VIII (April 8, 2015) and Secrets of Henry VIII’s Palace (June 30, 2013) include segments that display and discuss "eavedrops", carved wooden figures Henry VIII had built into the eaves (overhanging edges of the beams in the ceiling) of Hampton Court to discourage unwanted gossip or dissension from the King's wishes and rule, to foment paranoia and fear, and demonstrate that everything said there was being overheard; literally, that the walls had ears.

== Techniques ==
Eavesdropping vectors include telephone lines, cellular networks, email, and other methods of private instant messaging. Devices that support VoIP and other communication software are also vulnerable to electronic eavesdropping by computer viruses categorized as trojan viruses or more broadly as spyware.

== Network attacks ==
Network eavesdropping is a network layer attack that focuses on capturing small packets from the network transmitted by other computers and reading the data content in search of any type of information. This type of network attack is generally one of the most effective as a lack of encryption services are used and when the connection between the two endpoints are weak and not secure. It is also linked to the collection of metadata.

== Security ==
There is a growing importance of security in communication systems, specifically in Wireless technology. The need for security measures at different levels, including software encryption, hardware protection (e.g., trusted platform modules), and even the physical layer using wave-front engineering is as crucial than ever.

Researchers have expressed the importance of addressing the privacy concerns from eavesdropping attacks because they impact the rights of users and the ability to have confidence in the devices as well as the entire Internet. Ensuring that users have trust and confidence in their Internet activities is important so users continue to engage actively in the system and share data.

== See also ==
- Cellphone surveillance
- Computer surveillance
- Covert listening device
- ECHELON
- Espionage
- Fiber tapping
- Global surveillance disclosures (2013–present)
- Katz v. United States (1967)
- Keystroke logging
- Listening station
- Magic (cryptography)
- Man-in-the-middle attack
- Mass surveillance
- NSA warrantless surveillance controversy (December 2005 – 2006)
- Opportunistic encryption
- Party line
- People watching
- Privacy
- Secure communication
- Speke Hall, containing a physical eavesdrop for listening to people waiting at the door
- Surveillance
- Ultra (cryptography)
- Wiretapping
