= Honey encryption =

Type of data encryption

Honey encryption is a type of data encryption that "produces a ciphertext, which, when decrypted with an incorrect key as guessed by the attacker, presents a plausible-looking yet incorrect plaintext."

== Creators ==
Ari Juels and Thomas Ristenpart of the University of Wisconsin, the developers of the encryption system, presented a paper on honey encryption at the 2014 Eurocrypt cryptography conference.

== Method of protection ==
A brute-force attack involves repeated decryption with random keys; this is equivalent to picking random plaintexts from the space of all possible plaintexts with a uniform distribution. This is effective because even though the attacker is equally likely to see any given plaintext, most plaintexts are extremely unlikely to be legitimate i.e. the distribution of legitimate plaintexts is non-uniform. Honey encryption defeats such attacks by first transforming the plaintext into a space such that the distribution of legitimate plaintexts is uniform. Thus an attacker guessing keys will see legitimate-looking plaintexts frequently and random-looking plaintexts infrequently. This makes it difficult to determine when the correct key has been guessed. In effect, honey encryption "[serves] up fake data in response to every incorrect guess of the password or encryption key."

The security of honey encryption relies on the fact that the probability of an attacker judging a plaintext to be legitimate can be calculated (by the encrypting party) at the time of encryption. This makes honey encryption difficult to apply in certain applications e.g. where the space of plaintexts is very large or the distribution of plaintexts is unknown. It also means that honey encryption can be vulnerable to brute-force attacks if this probability is miscalculated. For example, it is vulnerable to known-plaintext attacks: if the attacker has a crib that a plaintext must match to be legitimate, they will be able to brute-force even Honey Encrypted data if the encryption did not take the crib into account.

== Example ==
An encrypted credit card number is susceptible to brute-force attacks because not every string of digits is equally likely. The number of digits can range from 13 to 19, though 16 is the most common. Additionally, it must have a valid IIN and the last digit must match the checksum. An attacker can also take into account the popularity of various services: an IIN from MasterCard is probably more likely than an IIN from Diners Club Carte Blanche.

Honey encryption can protect against these attacks by first mapping credit card numbers to a larger space where they match their likelihood of legitimacy. Numbers with invalid IINs and checksums are not mapped at all (i.e. have probability 0 of legitimacy). Numbers from large brands like MasterCard and Visa map to large regions of this space, while less popular brands map to smaller regions, etc. An attacker brute-forcing such an encryption scheme would only see legitimate-looking credit card numbers when they brute-force, and the numbers would appear with the frequency the attacker would expect from the real world.

== Application ==
Juels and Ristenpart aim to use honey encryption to protect data stored on password manager services. Juels stated that "password managers are a tasty target for criminals," and worries that "if criminals get a hold of a large collection of encrypted password vaults they could probably unlock many of them without too much trouble."

Hristo Bojinov, CEO and founder of Anfacto, noted that "Honey Encryption could help reduce their vulnerability. But he notes that not every type of data will be easy to protect this way. … Not all authentication or encryption system yield themselves to being honeyed."
