= Larry Wortzel =

American soldier and military attaché

Larry M. Wortzel
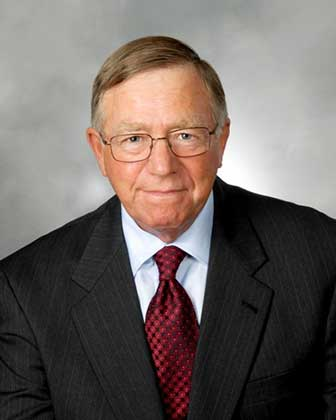
- Born: 1947 (age 78–79)
- Occupations: Military officer, political scientist, U.S. Congressional commissioner
- Known for: Sinology

Larry M. Wortzel (born 1947) is an American military officer and political scientist. He served nine terms as a commissioner on the United States-China Economic and Security Review Commission of the United States Congress. A 32-year military veteran, he was a U.S. Army colonel, director of the Strategic Studies Institute of the United States Army War College, and vice president of The Heritage Foundation. He was a military attaché at the U.S. Embassy in Beijing, and witnessed the Tiananmen Massacre in 1989. He is considered one of the United States' top experts on China and its military strategy. He is Senior Fellow in Asian Security at the American Foreign Policy Council.

== Career ==
Larry Wortzel received a B.A. degree from Columbus College (now Columbus State University) in Columbus, Georgia, and earned his Master's and Ph.D. degrees in political science from the University of Hawaiʻi.

Wortzel spent three years in the U.S. Marine Corps before attending college, and then enlisted in the U.S. Army in 1970, during the Vietnam War. He was assigned to the Army Security Agency in Thailand to monitor Chinese military communications in nearby Vietnam and Laos. By 1973 he graduated from the Infantry Officer Candidate School, Airborne training and Ranger training. He is a graduate of the United States Army War College.

He shifted to military intelligence after serving as an infantry officer for four years. From 1978 to 1982, he served at the Intelligence Center Pacific of the U.S. Pacific Command. He then enrolled in advanced Chinese language studies at the National University of Singapore. Next he served as a counterintelligence special agent at the Office of the Secretary of Defense for four years, and worked in foreign intelligence with the U.S. Army Intelligence and Security Command.

From 1988 to 1990, Wortzel was an assistant military attaché at the American Embassy in Beijing, and witnessed and reported on the Tiananmen Square protests of 1989 and the subsequent army crackdown. In 1995, he returned to the embassy as the Army Attaché.

In 1997, Wortzel became the director of the Strategic Studies Institute of the U.S. Army War College, and a faculty member of the college. In 1999, he retired from the Army as a colonel after 32 years of military service.

From 1999 to 2006, Wortzel served as Asian Studies Center director and vice president for foreign policy at The Heritage Foundation. Since 2001, he served for nine terms as a Commissioner of the U.S.-China Economic and Security Review Commission of the United States Congress. His term expired on December 31, 2020.

== Personal ==
Wortzel is married and lives in Williamsburg, Virginia.

== Selected publications ==
- Class in China: stratification in a classless society. Greenwood Press. 1987. ISBN 978-0-313-25498-7.
- China's Military Modernization: International Implications. Greenwood Press. 1988. ISBN 978-0-313-25626-4.
- The Chinese Armed Forces in the 21st Century. Strategic Studies Institute, U.S. Army War College. 1999. ISBN 978-1-58487-007-4.
- Dictionary of Contemporary Chinese Military History. ABC-CLIO. 1999. ISBN 978-0-313-29337-5.
- The Lessons of History: The Chinese People's Liberation Army at 75 (PDF). Strategic Studies Institute, U.S. Army War College. 2003. ISBN 978-1-4289-1651-7. Archived from the original (PDF) on November 13, 2005.
- The Dragon Extends its Reach: Chinese Military Power Goes Global. Potomac Books, Inc. 15 June 2013. ISBN 978-1-61234-406-5.
