= Keylogger =

Action of recording the keys struck on a keyboard

A keystroke logger (keylogger) is a hardware or software component for logging the input of a keyboard. The person using the keyboard is typically unaware that their actions are being monitored. Data can then be retrieved by the person operating the logging program.

While the programs themselves are legal, with many designed to allow employers to oversee the use of their computers, keyloggers are most often used for stealing passwords and other confidential information. Keystroke logging can also be utilized to monitor activities of children in schools or at home and by law enforcement officials to investigate malicious usage.

Keylogging can also be used to study keystroke dynamics or human-computer interaction. Numerous keylogging methods exist, ranging from hardware and software-based approaches to acoustic cryptanalysis.

== History ==
In the mid-1970s, the Soviet Union developed and deployed a hardware keylogger targeting US Embassy typewriters. Termed the "selectric bug", it transmitted the typed characters on IBM Selectric typewriters via magnetic detection of the mechanisms causing rotation of the print head. An early keylogger was written by Perry Kivolowitz and posted to the Usenet newsgroup net.unix-wizards, net.sources on November 17, 1983. The posting seems to be a motivating factor in restricting access to /dev/kmem on Unix systems. The user-mode program operated by locating and dumping character lists (clients) as they were assembled in the Unix kernel.

In the 1970s, spies installed keystroke loggers in the US Embassy and Consulate buildings in Moscow. They installed the bugs in Selectric II and Selectric III electric typewriters.

Soviet embassies used manual typewriters, rather than electric typewriters, for classified information—apparently because they are immune to such bugs. As of 2013, Russian special services still use typewriters.

== Types ==
=== Software ===
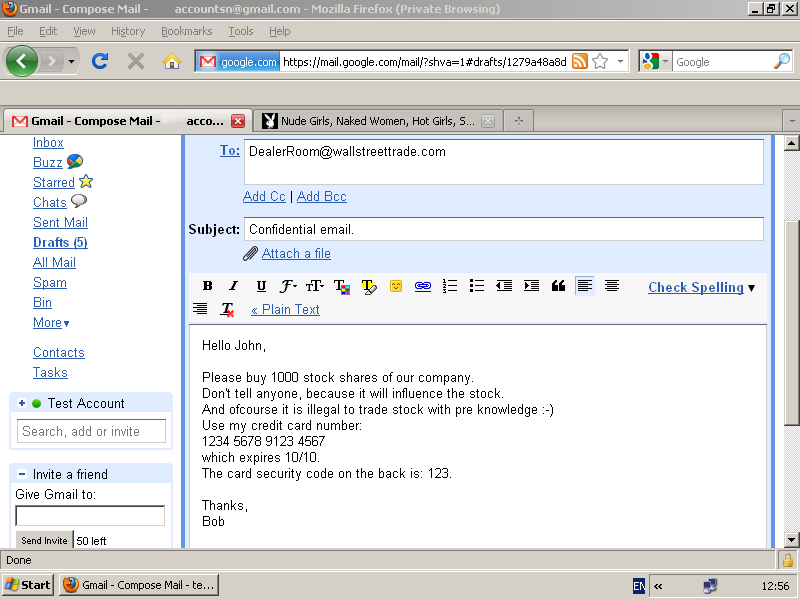
A keylogger example of a screen capture, which holds potentially confidential and private information. The image below holds the corresponding keylogger text result.

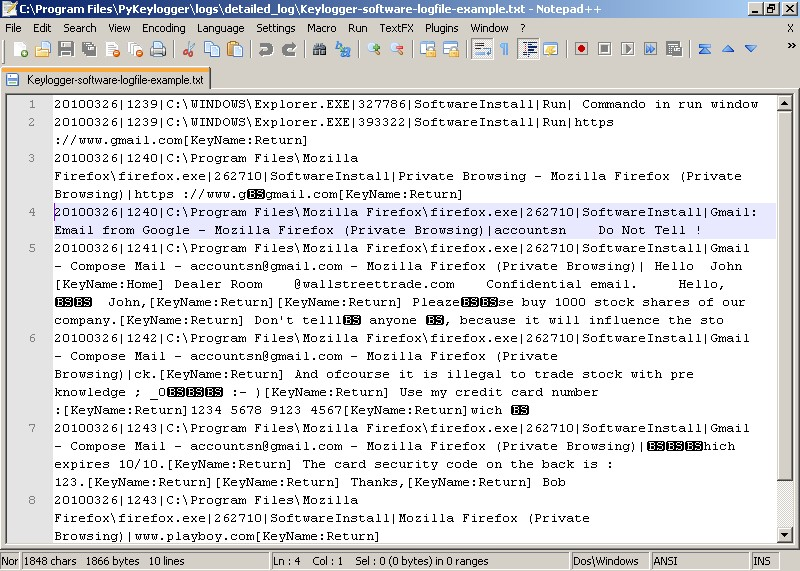
A logfile from a software-based keylogger, based on the screen capture above

A software-based keylogger is a computer program designed to record any input from the keyboard. Keyloggers are used in IT organizations to troubleshoot technical problems with computers and business networks. Families and businesspeople use keyloggers legally to monitor network usage without their users' direct knowledge. Microsoft publicly stated that Windows 10 has a built-in keylogger in its final version "to improve typing and writing services". However, malicious individuals can use keyloggers on public computers to steal passwords or credit card information. Most keyloggers are not stopped by HTTPS encryption because that only protects data in transit between computers; software-based keyloggers run on the affected user's computer, reading keyboard inputs directly as the user types.

From a technical perspective, there are several categories:

- Hypervisor-based: The keylogger can theoretically reside in a malware hypervisor running underneath the operating system, which thus remains untouched. It effectively becomes a virtual machine. Blue Pill is a conceptual example.
- Kernel-based: A program on the machine obtains root access to hide in the OS and intercepts keystrokes that pass through the kernel. This method is difficult both to write and to combat. Such keyloggers reside at the kernel level, which makes them difficult to detect, especially for user-mode applications that do not have root access. They are frequently implemented as rootkits that subvert the operating system kernel to gain unauthorized access to the hardware. This makes them very powerful. A keylogger using this method can act as a keyboard device driver, for example, and thus gain access to any information typed on the keyboard as it goes to the operating system.
- API-based: These keyloggers hook keyboard APIs inside a running application. The keylogger registers keystroke events as if it was a normal piece of the application instead of malware. The keylogger receives an event each time the user presses or releases a key. The keylogger simply records it. This is usually done by inject a DLL to other processes.
  - Windows APIs such as GetAsyncKeyState(), GetForegroundWindow(), etc. are used to poll the state of the keyboard or to subscribe to keyboard events. A more recent example simply polls the BIOS for pre-boot authentication PINs that have not been cleared from memory.
- Form grabbing based: Form grabbing-based keyloggers log Web form submissions by recording the form data on submit events. This happens when the user completes a form and submits it, usually by clicking a button or pressing enter. This type of keylogger records form data before it is passed over the Internet.
- IME-based: A malicious IME can do keylogging.
- JavaScript-based: A malicious script tag is injected into a targeted web page, and listens for key events such as onKeyUp(). Scripts can be injected via a variety of methods, including cross-site scripting, man-in-the-browser, man-in-the-middle, or a compromise of the remote website.
- Memory-injection-based: Memory Injection (MitB)-based keyloggers perform their logging function by altering the memory tables associated with the browser and other system functions. By patching the memory tables or injecting directly into memory, this technique can be used by malware authors to bypass Windows UAC (User Account Control). The Zeus and SpyEye trojans use this method exclusively. Non-Windows systems have protection mechanisms that allow access to locally recorded data from a remote location. Remote communication may be achieved when one of these methods is used:
  - Data is uploaded to a website, database or an FTP server.
  - Data is periodically emailed to a pre-defined email address.
  - Data is Wirelessly transmitted employing an attached hardware system.
  - The software enables a remote login to the local machine from the Internet or the local network, for data logs stored on the target machine.

==== Keystroke logging in writing process research ====
Since 2006, keystroke logging has been an established research method for the study of writing processes. Different programs have been developed to collect online process data of writing activities, including Inputlog, Scriptlog, Translog, GGXLog, and TypeFlow.

Keystroke logging is used legitimately as a suitable research instrument in several writing contexts. These include studies on cognitive writing processes, which include

- descriptions of writing strategies; the writing development of children (with and without writing difficulties),
- spelling,
- first and second language writing, and
- specialist skill areas such as translation and subtitling.

Keystroke logging can be used to research writing, specifically. It can also be integrated into educational domains for second language learning, programming skills, and typing skills.

==== Keystroke logging as a secure defense ====
Recently, there has been extensive research completed into the use of keystroke logging data not only as a form of attack, but also as a form of behavioral defense for users. A 2020 study, "Passphrase and Keystroke Dynamics Authentication" by Ahmed and Traore evaluated whether keystroke-dynamics models could support the strategy of continuous authentication. Continuous authentication is a prevention strategy that takes advantage of the users normal behaviors to establish a baseline, and then checks for deviations from that baseline to detect adversarial activity. This study analyzed the performance of several machine learning classifiers to identify user typing patterns, latencies, and timing. The authors found that even small deviations in typing patterns could be strong indicators of impersonations. This suggests that keystroke logging data can serve defensive purposes when captured ethically and with the users permission.

This study also reported that machine learning models trained on genuine typing behavior achieved low false acceptance and false rejection rates in most instances, showing that the use of continuous authentication systems can operate with low error rates. They also found that the typing patterns of most people have enough discriminatory signals that you could create a personal profile based on the typing habits alone. This shows that the same core exploits used by malicious attackers can also form the basis of security systems designed to protect users from intrusions and impersonations. The authors concluded that while keystroke-dynamics authentication is promising, its deployment must carefully balance security, usability, and privacy considerations for the optimal user experience.

==== Related features ====
Software keyloggers may be augmented with features that capture user information without relying on keyboard key presses as the sole input. Some of these features include:

- Clipboard logging. Anything that has been copied to the clipboard can be captured by the program.
- Screen logging. Screenshots are taken to capture graphics-based information. Applications with screen logging abilities may take screenshots of the whole screen, of just one application, or even just around the mouse cursor. They may take these screenshots periodically or in response to user behaviors (for example, when a user clicks the mouse). Screen logging can be used to capture data inputted with an on-screen keyboard.
- Programmatically capturing the text in a control. The Microsoft Windows API allows programs to request the text 'value' in some controls. This means that some passwords may be captured, even if they are hidden behind password masks (usually asterisks).
- The recording of every program/folder/window opened including a screenshot of every website visited.
- The recording of search engines queries, instant messenger conversations, FTP downloads and other Internet-based activities (including the bandwidth used).

=== Hardware ===
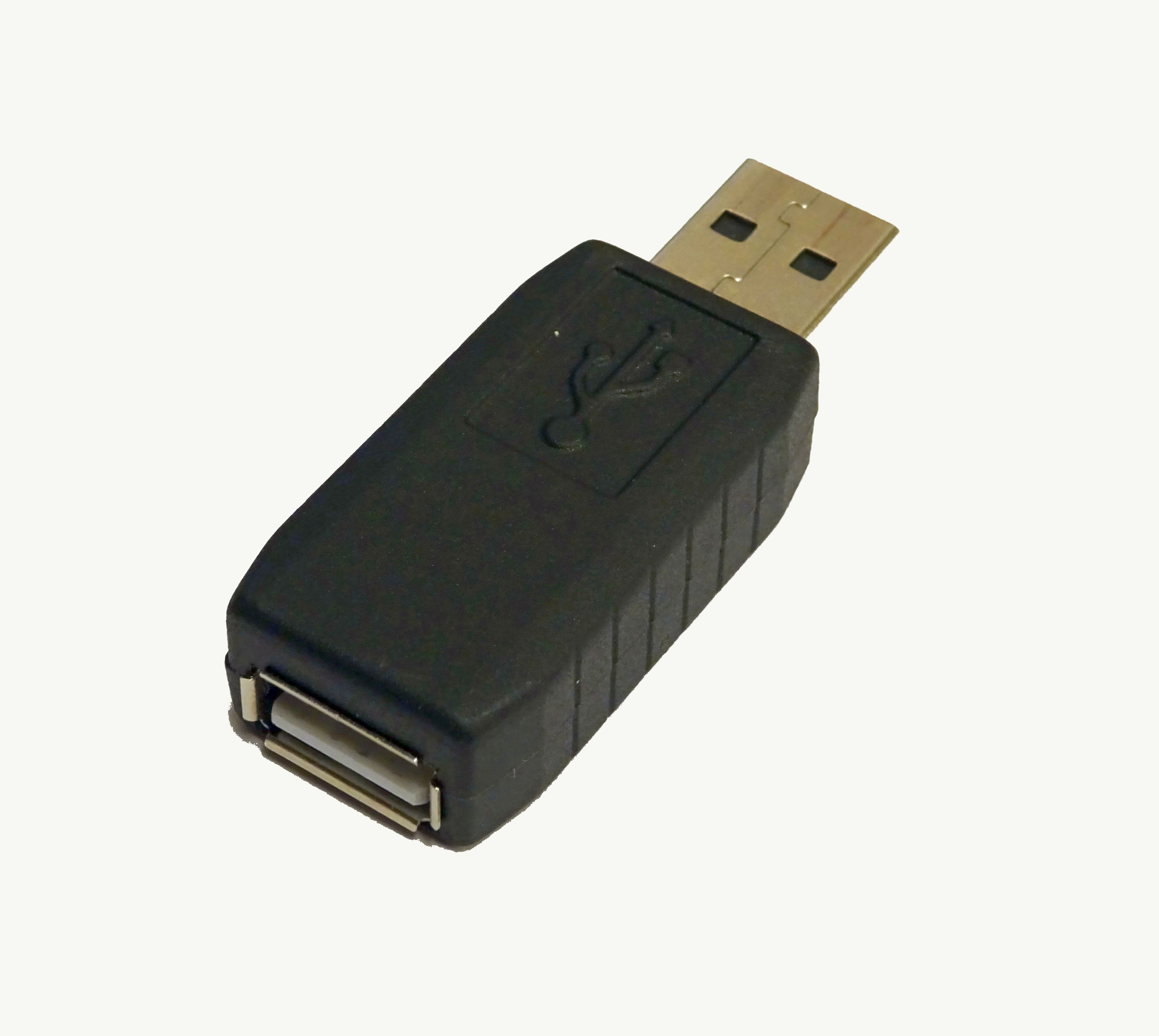
A Hardware keylogger for USB-Keyboards

Hardware keyloggers are used for keystroke logging, a method of capturing and recording computer users' keystrokes, including sensitive passwords. They can be implemented via BIOS-level firmware, or alternatively, via a device plugged inline between a computer keyboard and a computer. They log all keyboard activity to their internal memory.

Hardware keyloggers have an advantage over software keyloggers as they can begin logging from the moment a computer is turned on (and are therefore able to intercept passwords for the BIOS or disk encryption software

All hardware keylogger devices have to have the following:

- A microcontroller - this interprets the datastream between the keyboard and computer, processes it, and passes it to the non-volatile memory
- A non-volatile memory device, such as flash memory - this stores the recorded data, retaining it even when power is lost

Generally, recorded data is retrieved by typing a special password into a computer text editor. The hardware keylogger plugged in between the keyboard and computer detects that the password has been typed and then presents the computer with "typed" data to produce a menu. Beyond text menu some keyloggers offer a high-speed download to speed up retrieval of stored data; this can be via USB mass-storage enumeration or with a USB or serial download adapter.

Typically the memory capacity of a hardware keylogger may range from a few kilobytes to several gigabytes, with each keystroke recorded typically consuming a byte of memory.

==== Types of hardware keyloggers ====
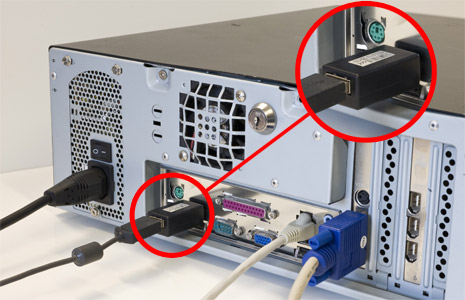
A connected hardware-based keylogger.

1. A regular hardware keylogger is used for keystroke logging by means of a hardware circuit that is attached somewhere in between the computer keyboard and the computer. It logs all keyboard activity to its internal memory which can be accessed by typing in a series of pre-defined characters. A hardware keylogger has an advantage over a software solution; because it is not dependent on the computer's operating system it will not interfere with any program running on the target machine and hence cannot be detected by any software. They are typically designed to have an innocuous appearance that blends in with the rest of the cabling or hardware, such as appearing to be an EMC Balun. They can also be installed inside a keyboard itself (as a circuit attachment or modification), or the keyboard could be manufactured with this "feature". They are designed to work with legacy PS/2 keyboards, or more recently, with USB keyboards. Some variants, known as wireless hardware keyloggers, have the ability to be controlled and monitored remotely by means of a wireless communication standard.
2. Wireless keylogger sniffers - Collect packets of data being transferred from a wireless keyboard and its receiver and then attempt to crack the encryption key being used to secure wireless communications between the two devices.
3. Firmware - A computer's BIOS, which is typically responsible for handling keyboard events, can be reprogrammed so that it records keystrokes as it processes them.
4. Keyboard overlays - a fake keypad is placed over the real one so that any keys pressed are registered by both the eavesdropping device as well as the legitimate one that the customer is using.
5. Key commands - exist in much legitimate software. These programs require keyloggers to know when you’re using a specific command.

== Cracking ==
Writing simple software applications for keylogging can be trivial, and like any nefarious computer program, can be distributed as a trojan horse or as part of a virus. What is not trivial for an attacker, however, is installing a covert keystroke logger without getting caught and downloading data that has been logged without being traced. An attacker that manually connects to a host machine to download logged keystrokes risks being traced. A trojan that sends keylogged data to a fixed e-mail address or IP address risks exposing the attacker.

=== Trojans ===
Researchers Adam Young and Moti Yung discussed several methods of sending keystroke logging. They presented a deniable password snatching attack in which the keystroke logging trojan is installed using a virus or worm. An attacker who is caught with the virus or worm can claim to be a victim. The cryptotrojan asymmetrically encrypts the pilfered login/password pairs using the public key of the trojan author and covertly broadcasts the resulting ciphertext. They mentioned that the ciphertext can be steganographically encoded and posted to a public bulletin board such as Usenet.

=== Use by police ===
In 2000, the FBI used FlashCrest iSpy to obtain the PGP passphrase of Nicodemo Scarfo, Jr., son of mob boss Nicodemo Scarfo. Also in 2000, the FBI lured two suspected Russian cybercriminals to the US in an elaborate ruse, and captured their usernames and passwords with a keylogger that was covertly installed on a machine that they used to access their computers in Russia. The FBI then used these credentials to gain access to the suspects' computers in Russia to obtain evidence to prosecute them.

== Countermeasures ==
The effectiveness of countermeasures varies because keyloggers use a variety of techniques to capture data and the countermeasure needs to be effective against the particular data capture technique. In the case of Windows 10 keylogging by Microsoft, changing certain privacy settings may disable it. An on-screen keyboard will be effective against hardware keyloggers; transparency will defeat some—but not all—screen loggers. An anti-spyware application that can only disable hook-based keyloggers will be ineffective against kernel-based keyloggers.

Keylogger program authors may be able to update their program's code to adapt to countermeasures that have proven effective against it.

=== Anti-keyloggers ===
An anti-keylogger is a piece of software specifically designed to detect keyloggers on a computer, typically comparing all files in the computer against a database of keyloggers, looking for similarities which might indicate the presence of a hidden keylogger. As anti-keyloggers have been designed specifically to detect keyloggers, they have the potential to be more effective than conventional antivirus software; some antivirus software do not consider keyloggers to be malware, as under some circumstances a keylogger can be considered a legitimate piece of software.

=== Live CD/USB ===
Rebooting the computer using a Live CD or write-protected Live USB is a possible countermeasure against software keyloggers if the CD is clean of malware and the operating system contained on it is secured and fully patched so that it cannot be infected as soon as it is started. Booting a different operating system does not impact the use of a hardware or BIOS based keylogger.

=== Anti-spyware / Anti-virus programs ===
Many anti-spyware applications can detect some software based keyloggers and quarantine, disable, or remove them. However, because many keylogging programs are legitimate pieces of software under some circumstances, anti-spyware often neglects to label keylogging programs as spyware or a virus. These applications can detect software-based keyloggers based on patterns in executable code, heuristics and keylogger behaviors (such as the use of hooks and certain APIs).

No software-based anti-spyware application can be 100% effective against all keyloggers. Software-based anti-spyware cannot defeat non-software keyloggers (for example, hardware keyloggers attached to keyboards will always receive keystrokes before any software-based anti-spyware application).

The particular technique that the anti-spyware application uses will influence its potential effectiveness against software keyloggers. As a general rule, anti-spyware applications with higher privileges will defeat keyloggers with lower privileges. For example, a hook-based anti-spyware application cannot defeat a kernel-based keylogger (as the keylogger will receive the keystroke messages before the anti-spyware application), but it could potentially defeat hook- and API-based keyloggers.

=== Network monitors ===
Network monitors (also known as reverse-firewalls) can be used to alert the user whenever an application attempts to make a network connection. This gives the user the chance to prevent the keylogger from "phoning home" with their typed information.

=== Automatic form filler programs ===
Automatic form-filling programs may prevent keylogging by removing the requirement for a user to type personal details and passwords using the keyboard. Form fillers are primarily designed for Web browsers to fill in checkout pages and log users into their accounts. Once the user's account and credit card information has been entered into the program, it will be automatically entered into forms without ever using the keyboard or clipboard, thereby reducing the possibility that private data is being recorded. However, someone with physical access to the machine may still be able to install software that can intercept this information elsewhere in the operating system or while in transit on the network. (Transport Layer Security (TLS) reduces the risk that data in transit may be intercepted by network sniffers and proxy tools.)

=== One-time passwords (OTP) ===
Using one-time passwords may prevent unauthorized access to an account which has had its login details exposed to an attacker via a keylogger, as each password is invalidated as soon as it is used. This solution may be useful for someone using a public computer. However, an attacker who has remote control over such a computer can simply wait for the victim to enter their credentials before performing unauthorized transactions on their behalf while their session is active.

Another common way to protect access codes from being stolen by keystroke loggers is by asking users to provide a few randomly selected characters from their authentication code. For example, they might be asked to enter the 2nd, 5th, and 8th characters. Even if someone is watching the user or using a keystroke logger, they would only get a few characters from the code without knowing their positions.

=== Security tokens ===
Use of smart cards or other security tokens may improve security against replay attacks in the face of a successful keylogging attack, as accessing protected information would require both the (hardware) security token as well as the appropriate password/passphrase. Knowing the keystrokes, mouse actions, display, clipboard, etc. used on one computer will not subsequently help an attacker gain access to the protected resource. Some security tokens work as a type of hardware-assisted one-time password system, and others implement a cryptographic challenge–response authentication, which can improve security in a manner conceptually similar to one time passwords. Smartcard readers and their associated keypads for PIN entry may be vulnerable to keystroke logging through a so-called supply chain attack where an attacker substitutes the card reader/PIN entry hardware for one which records the user's PIN.

=== On-screen keyboards ===
Most on-screen keyboards (such as the on-screen keyboard that comes with Windows XP) send normal keyboard event messages to the external target program to type text. Software key loggers can log these typed characters sent from one program to another.

=== Keystroke interference software ===
Keystroke interference software is also available. These programs attempt to trick keyloggers by introducing random keystrokes, although this simply results in the keylogger recording more information than it needs to. An attacker has the task of extracting the keystrokes of interest—the security of this mechanism, specifically how well it stands up to cryptanalysis, is unclear.

=== Operating system built-in security ===
Since Windows Vista, a software to inject DLL requires the UAC administrative rights, and all drivers must have the legal digital signature. In Windows Vista, the User Interface Privilege Isolation was introduced, which makes desktop session (as well as audio and clipboard within desktop session) for different users are isolated. Since Windows 11, it requires Secure Boot, and if Secure Boot is enabled, only WHQL validated drivers are allowed. Since Windows 11, version 24H2, it added app permissions control in Windows Settings for Screenshot and Screen Recording; however disable this toggle in Windows 11 only disallows the Windows.Graphics.Capture permissions, but the DXGI capture is still allowed.

=== Speech recognition ===
Similar to on-screen keyboards, speech-to-text conversion software can also be used against keyloggers, since there are no typing or mouse movements involved. The weakest point of using voice-recognition software may be how the software sends the recognized text to target software after the user's speech has been processed.

=== Handwriting recognition and mouse gestures ===
Many PDAs and lately tablet PCs can already convert pen (also called stylus) movements on their touchscreens to computer understandable text successfully. Mouse gestures use this principle by using mouse movements instead of a stylus. Mouse gesture programs convert these strokes to user-definable actions, such as typing text. Similarly, graphics tablets and light pens can be used to input these gestures, however, these are becoming less common.

The same potential weakness of speech recognition applies to this technique as well.

=== Macro expanders/recorders ===
With the help of many programs, a seemingly meaningless text can be expanded to a meaningful text and most of the time context-sensitively, e.g. "en.wikipedia.org" can be expanded when a web browser window has the focus. The biggest weakness of this technique is that these programs send their keystrokes directly to the target program. However, this can be overcome by using the 'alternating' technique described below, i.e. sending mouse clicks to non-responsive areas of the target program, sending meaningless keys, sending another mouse click to the target area (e.g. password field) and switching back-and-forth.

=== Deceptive typing ===
Alternating between typing the login credentials and typing characters somewhere else in the focus window can cause a keylogger to record more information than it needs to, but this could be easily filtered out by an attacker. Similarly, a user can move their cursor using the mouse while typing, causing the logged keystrokes to be in the wrong order e.g., by typing a password beginning with the last letter and then using the mouse to move the cursor for each subsequent letter. Lastly, someone can also use context menus to remove, cut, copy, and paste parts of the typed text without using the keyboard. An attacker who can capture only parts of a password will have a larger key space to attack if they choose to execute a brute-force attack.

Another very similar technique uses the fact that any selected text portion is replaced by the next key typed. e.g., if the password is "secret", one could type "s", then some dummy keys "asdf". These dummy characters could then be selected with the mouse, and the next character from the password "e" typed, which replaces the dummy characters "asdf".

These techniques assume incorrectly that keystroke logging software cannot directly monitor the clipboard, the selected text in a form, or take a screenshot every time a keystroke or mouse click occurs. They may, however, be effective against some hardware keyloggers.

== See also ==
- Anti-keylogger
- Black-bag cryptanalysis
- Computer surveillance
- Cybercrime
- Digital footprint
- Hardware keylogger
- Reverse connection
- Session replay
- Spyware
- Trojan horse
- Virtual keyboard
- Web tracking
