= Criticomm =

CRITICOM(M) is an abbreviation for "Critical Intelligence Communications [System]" q.v. National Security Agency (NSA) former flash-intelligence alert and warning system. N.B. The official intelligence-community (IC) abbreviation uses two Ms.

The Critical Intelligence Communications network, or CRITICOMM, is designed to flash to the American President and a handful of other senior officials intelligence alerts and warnings of the highest priority—an imminent coup in a Middle East sheikdom, for example, or the assassination of a world leader, or the sinking of a Soviet sub. It is the goal of NSA to have such a CRITIC message on the President's desk within ten minutes of the event. An example of a CRITIC message being sent is the USSS Pueblo that was captured by North Korea. CTO2 Don McClarren, who was on the ship at the time, notified the Comms Center in Kamiseya, Japan of the attack. After being received by the Comms Center, the message was passed to CTO3 Paul Allen USNSG who then transmitted it using a Teletype Model 33.

. . . . In 1973 NSA's CRITICOM/SPINTCOM network was transformed into the Digital Network-Defense Special Security Communications System (DIN/DSCSS), which fully integrated the message traffic into the Defense Department's general service AUTODIN network (automatic digital network).

== Sources ==
- , USS Pueblo (AGER-2)
- The Puzzle Palace, A Report on America's Most Secret Agency, by James Bamford, Houghton Mifflin 1982, p. 104
- CIA Insider's Dictionary of US and Foreign Intelligence, Counterintelligence and Tradecraft, edited by Leo D. Carl, NIBC Press, Washington, DC
