= Roaring Creek Station =

Satellite ground station in Pennsylvania, United States

Coordinates: 40.893°N 76.440°W

Roaring Creek Earth Station is a satellite ground station operated by AT&T and located approximately 4 miles (6.4 km) south of Catawissa, Pennsylvania at 311 Earth Station Rd, Catawissa, PA 17820. The facility includes three 105-foot (32 m) dishes that handle much of the communications between the United States and Europe and the Middle East. According to James Bamford, the National Security Agency uses the facility to capture and monitor satellite telecommunications traveling in and out of the United States.

Roaring Creek Station opened in June 1984 under the co-ownership of COMSAT (50 percent), AT&T (47.5 percent), RCA and Western Union (2.5 percent), with COMSAT operating the facility. COMSAT sold its stake in the station and two others to AT&T for $55 million in January 1988.

== See also ==
- Jamesburg Earth Station

Bibliography
