= Salt Creek Station =

Coordinates: 38.938°N 122.149°W

Salt Creek Earth Station is a satellite ground station approximately 7 miles (11 km) southwest of Arbuckle, California. It is licensed to Xaba Ranch, LLC, a real estate holding company. The site was formerly licensed to AT&T, for whom it carried much of the United States' telecommunications to Asia and the Pacific Rim. AT&T opened the facility in May 1990 with three 60-foot (18 m) wide dishes each aimed at different satellites over the Pacific Ocean. According to James Bamford, the National Security Agency uses the facility to capture and monitor satellite telecommunications traveling in and out of the United States.
