= Title IX of the Patriot Act =

Title IX: Improved Intelligence is the ninth of ten titles which comprise the USA PATRIOT Act, an anti-terrorism bill passed in the United States after the September 11, 2001 attacks. It amends the National Security Act of 1947 to require the Director of Central Intelligence (DCI) to establish requirements and priorities for foreign intelligence collected under the Foreign Intelligence Surveillance Act of 1978 and to provide assistance to the United States Attorney General to ensure that information derived from electronic surveillance or physical searches is disseminated for efficient and effective foreign intelligence purposes.

== Central Intelligence director ==
A number of aspects of the Directorship of U.S. Central Intelligence were addressed in Title IX of the Patriot Act. The Director was given responsibility under section 901 to establish requirements and priorities for foreign intelligence information to be collected under the Foreign Intelligence Surveillance Act of 1978 (FISA), and to assist the Attorney General with disseminating intelligence information. However, the Patriot Act limited the Director and gave him no authority to direct, manage, or undertake FISA-based electronic surveillance or physical search operations unless they have been authorized by statute or executive order.

Section 905 deals with matters relating to disclosure of foreign intelligence information. With the exception of information that might jeopardize an ongoing law enforcement investigation, it was made a requirement that the Attorney General, or the head of any other department or agency of the Federal Government with law enforcement responsibilities, disclose to the Director any foreign intelligence acquired by the U.S. Department of Justice. The Attorney General and Director of Central Intelligence were directed to develop procedures for the Attorney General to follow in order to inform the Director, in a timely manner, of any intention of investigating criminal activity of a foreign intelligence source or potential foreign intelligence source based on the intelligence tip-off of a memory of the intelligence community. The Attorney General was also directed to develop procedures on how to best administer these matters.

== Centers ==
The title commissioned several reports into various intelligence-related government centers. Section 906 ordered a report be written into the best way of setting up the National Virtual Translation Center, with the goal of developing automated translation facilities to assist with the timely and accurate translation of foreign intelligence information for elements of the U.S. intelligence community. The Patriot Act required this to be provided on February 1, 2002, however the report, entitled "Director of Central Intelligence Report on the National Virtual Translation Center: A Concept Plan to Enhance the Intelligence Community's Foreign Language Capabilities, April 29, 2002" was received more than two months late, which the Senate Select Committee on Intelligence reported was "a delay which, in addition to contravening the explicit words of the statute, deprived the Committee of timely and valuable input into its efforts to craft this legislation." Section 907 ordered a report to be written by February 1, 2002 on the feasibility and desirability of reconfiguring the Foreign Terrorist Asset Tracking Center and the Office of Foreign Assets Control of the Department of the Treasury. However, this report was never written. The Senate Select Committee on Intelligence later complained that "[t]he Director of Central Intelligence and the Secretary of the Treasury failed to provide a report, this time in direct contravention of a section of the USA PATRIOT Act" and they further directed "that the statutorily-directed report be completed immediately, and that it should include a section describing the circumstances which led to the Director's failure to comply with lawful reporting requirements."

== Other intelligence-related amendments ==
A number of amendments were made to other intelligence related matters. Section 903 of the Act specifies a sense of Congress that encourages officers and employees of the intelligence community to make every effort to establish and maintain intelligence relationships with any person, entity, or group while they conduct lawful intelligence activities. Under section 902, international terrorist activities were made to fall within the scope of foreign intelligence under the National Security Act of 1947.

Section 904 authorized the deferral of the submission to Congress of certain reports on intelligence and intelligence-related matters until either February 1, 2002 or a date after February 1, 2002, if the official involved certified that preparation and submission on February 1, 2002, would impede the work of officers or employees engaged in counterterrorism activities. Any such deferral required congressional notification before it was authorized.

The Attorney General was charged, under section 908 of the Patriot Act, with training officials in identifying and utilizing foreign intelligence information properly in the course of their duties. The government officials include those in the Federal Government who do not normally encounter or disseminate foreign intelligence in the performance of their duties, and State and local government officials who encounter, or potentially may encounter in the course of a terrorist event, foreign intelligence in the performance of their duties.
