= Polygraphia Nova =

1663 work by Athanasius Kircher

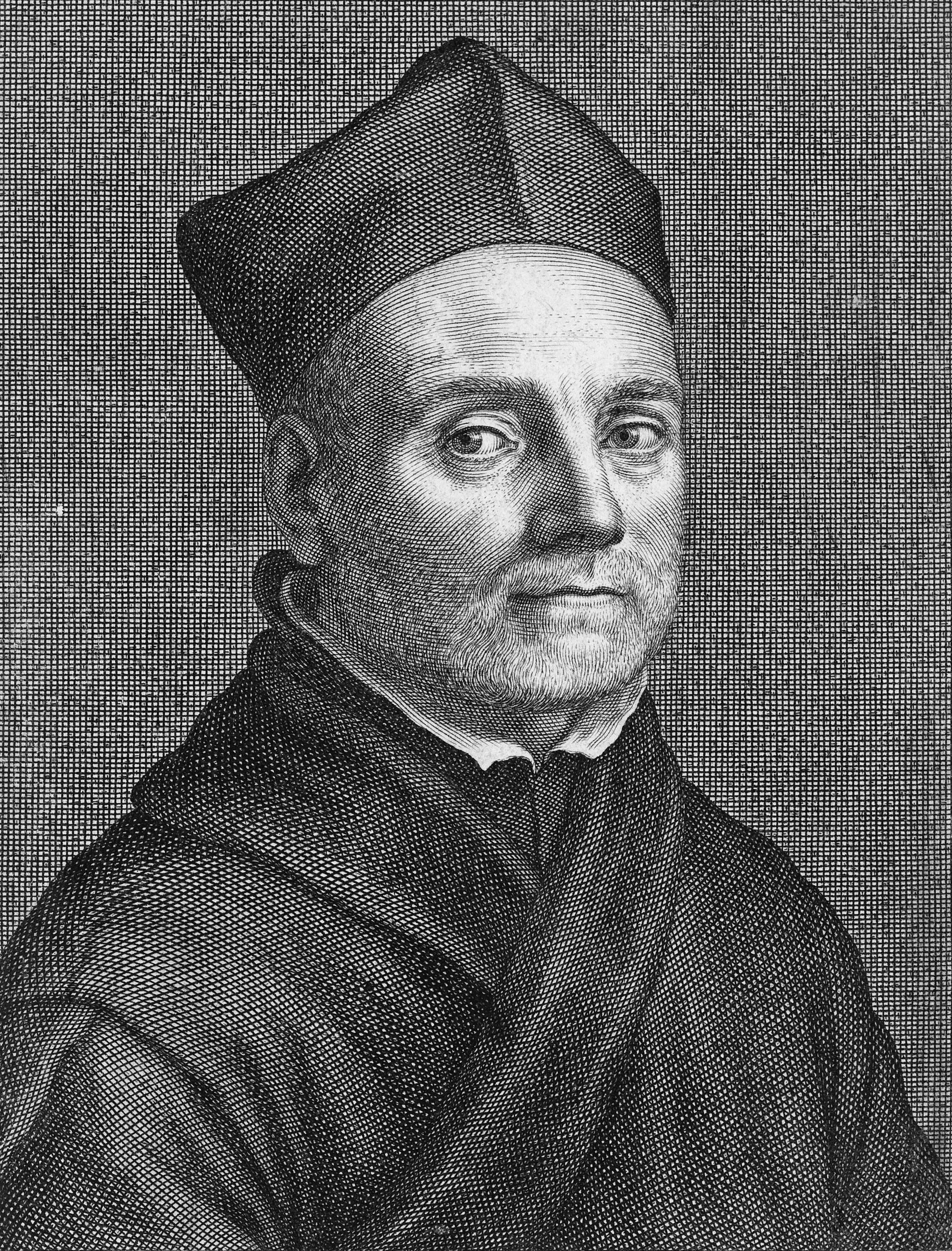
Athanasius Kircher

Polygraphia nova et universalis ex combinatoria arte directa is a 1663 work by the Jesuit scholar Athanasius Kircher. It was one of Kircher's most highly regarded works and his only complete work on the subject of cryptography, although he made passing references to the topic elsewhere. The book was distributed as a private gift to selected European rulers, some of whom also received an arca steganographica, a presentation chest containing wooden tallies used to encrypt and decrypt codes.

== Background ==
Kircher reported that the origin of the work was a request from Holy Roman Emperor Ferdinand III to develop "a kind of lingua universalis" which would allow written communication between all peoples. The Emperor knew of the earlier secret communication system developed by Johannes Trithemius in his 1518 work Polygraphia, dedicated to the art of steganography, and wanted to know if such a system could be used to bridge different languages.

Systems of cryptography had been developed in Italy in late medieval times and by the 17th century many rulers employed cipher secretaries for diplomatic and other sensitive communication. The Thirty Years War gave rise to a range of scholarly publications summarising existing knowledge of the field, and there was a growing interest in the relationship between cryptography and linguistics. Emperors Ferdinand III and Leopold I, who ruled over empires speaking many different languages, were particularly interested in this field.

The Jesuit order played an important role in spreading the idea of mathematics as a kind of universal scientific language. As well as geometry and theoretical mathematics, Jesuit scholars worked on a number of applied projects, including calculating machines such as the one Kircher had designed and then described in his 1637 work Specula Melitensis Encyclica and the Organum Mathematicum he had built for Emperor Ferdinand III. By such means the Jesuits sought to cultivate court patronage and to strengthen and propagate the Catholic faith. Kircher had an established interest in the origins and underlying unity of languages and writing systems, which he explored in various works including Prodromus Coptus (1636), Lingua Aegyptiaca Restituta (1643) and Turris Babel (1679). He had also studied the Voynich manuscript, although he apparently had no success in decoding it.

== Introduction ==
The title page of Polygraphia Nova carries an emblem of the hand of the divine creator holding a compass and describing a circle that bears the motto Omnia in uno sunt, & in omnibus unum ("all things are in one, and the one is in all things"). This axiom was central to all of Kircher's intellectual work, which explored how phenomena from different countries, different times and different belief-systems all shared fundamental unity. The axiom echoed the earlier beliefs of Catalan Neoplatonist Ramon Llull (1232–1316) and the philosophy of Saint Bonaventure, who believed that divine being permeated all aspects of existence, however apparently different they might be: 'Quia vero est summe unum et omnimodum, ideo est omnia in omnibus' ('But because it is most highly one and in every measure, for that reason it is all in all although all things be many and itself is not but one').

In his introduction, Kircher claimed that the book would allow correspondents in any part of the world to exchange letters without speaking each other's languages. In each section, Kircher acknowledged the work of earlier scholars, and the work thus presented a compendium of approaches not previously brought together.

== Section one ==
Polygraphia Nova was composed of three sections. The first, The Reduction of all Language to One offered a kind of translation device involving codes in which vocabulary lists were assigned a two-part symbol - a roman numeral and an Arabic numeral. The first part indicated meaning: Kircher provided 1048 multilingual groups of words arranged over 32 pages in tables organised alphabetically in the order of the Latin column. Thus, for example one entry is "magnitudo, grandezza, grandeur, grandeza, grösse" (greatness). All of these words are assigned the same first-part symbol. The second part denoted grammatical function (e.g. noun ("greatness"), verb ("make great") or adjective ("great")).

This would allow a writer in one language to record a version of their text in the code so that a reader who did not speak the same language could translate from the intermediate code into their own. It was based on the Tironian notes system, supposedly devised by Cicero's secretary. In 1624 Augustus the Younger, Duke of Brunswick-Lüneburg had published a book outlining this system, under the pseudonym 'Gustavus Selenus', and other scholars had also described it. Kircher's work was therefore not original, but he appended his own universal dictionary, making it a workable system for any rulers who had access to a copy of his book.

== Section two ==
While the first section was concerned with communicating meaning between languages through an intermediary code, the second section, The Extension of all Language to All allows the conversion of letters into Latin words, regardless of the language encoded. By this means a word in the original language can be rendered into Latin prose; a reader of the same language can then use the dictionary of Latin words to discover the original letter to which it corresponds. This section was based largely on the work of Johannes Trithemius. Kircher reminded the reader that the purpose of the work was to make possible the conversion of kings and princes around the world, and said that the method he described would allow a message to be written that could be understood in any language.

== Section three ==
The third section, A Technologia is about the Vigenère cipher. It explains how to use the tally sticks included in the Arca seu cista steganographica (steganographic ark or urn), a chest with twenty-four compartments holding 144 sticks that can be used like slide rules to rapidly encode and decode messages. Thus Kircher claims, the phrase Cave ab eo quem non nosti ('beware him who you do not know) can easily be translated into ten languages, including Hebrew, Greek, Arabic and Chinese.

== Distribution ==
Kircher did not keep an organised record of the people to whom he sent a copy of Polygraphia Nova or the arca steganographica and their distribution must be inferred from his correspondence. To further complicate matters, the early exemplars were sent out not with the complete book, but with manuscript versions of one or more of what afterwards became its sections; only later did he follow up by sending the complete book. Some recipients were sent a book, but not an arca; some were sent directly by Kircher himself, while others were sent through intermediaries to rulers with whom he did not enjoy direct contact.

The first arca was sent to Ferdinando II de' Medici, Grand Duke of Tuscany in 1659, and Kircher then sent texts on cryptography to Emperor Leopold, Archduke Leopold Wilhelm of Austria, Bernard Ignaz von Martinitz, Augustus the Younger, Duke of Brunswick-Lüneburg, Maximilian Heinrich, Elector of Cologne and Pope Alexander VII. In 1661 Kircher sent an arca to the Emperor's younger brother, Archduke Charles Joseph of Austria, which turned out to contain a number of errors. The difficulty of using the arca without a full explanatory manual may have prompted Kircher to produce a single, standard edition of his various manuscripts, and he started sending our copies of Polygraphia Nova in June 1663.

== Legacy ==
Although the work was much admired, as were the chests of tally sticks, there is no evidence that any ruler used them to attempt the translations he suggested. The only known instance of someone using the techniques described in Polygraphia Nova is an August 1663 letter to Kircher from his long-time correspondent Juan Caramuel y Lobkowitz, who had also been sent a copy.

In 1989 Eduardo Paolozzi created a sculpture fountain entitled Polygraphia Nova in Schwabing, Munich.

== External links (illustrations) ==
- Page from the dictionary for composing texts in Kircher’s universal language, Polygraphia Nova, p. 20.
- Table from the dictionary for translating Kircher’s universal language back into the vernaculars, Polygraphia Nova, p. 62.
- The steganographic ark, from Polygraphia Nova, p. 130

== Bibliography ==
- Bauer, F.L., Polygraphia Nova et Universalis. Informatik Spektrum 28, 234–239 (2005)
- Strasser, Gerhard F, Lingua universalis: Kryptologie und Theorie der Universalsprachen im 16. und 17. Jahrhundert, In Kommission bei O. Harrassowitz 1988 ISBN 978-3-447-02814-1
- Gunkel, David J., Lingua ex Machina: Computer-Mediated Communication and the Tower of Babel Configurations Volume 7, Number 1, Winter 1999, Johns Hopkins University Press
- Eco, Umberto, The Search for the Perfect Language, Wiley-Blackwell 1997 ISBN 978-0-631-20510-4
