= Steganographia =

15th-century book

Steganographia (book)
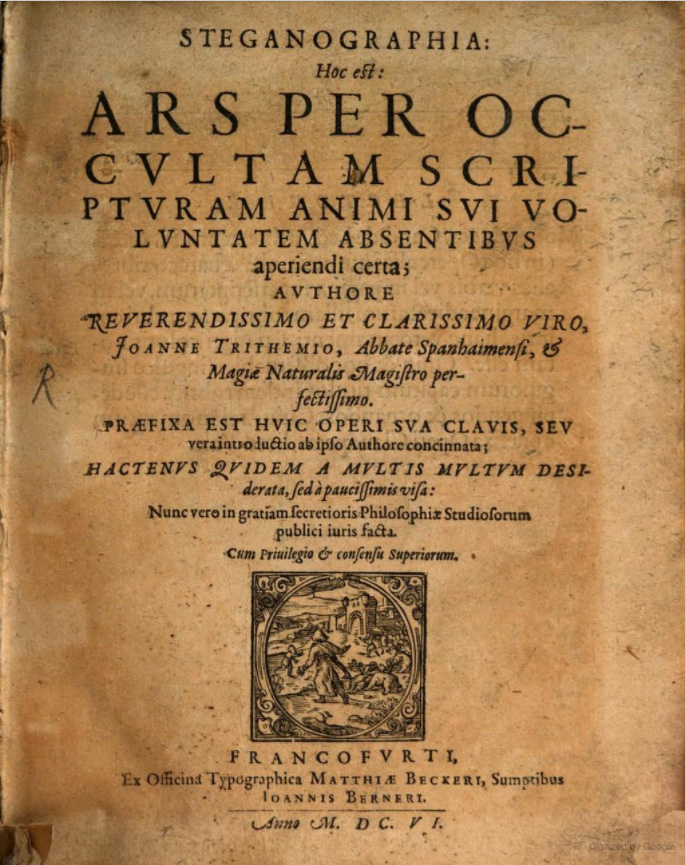
- Steganographia (1606).
- Author: Johannes Trithemius
- Original title: Steganographia
- Language: Latin
- Genre: Cryptographic, steganography
- Publication date: c. 1499
- Publication place: Germany
- English publication date: N/A
- Media type: Printed book
- Preceded by: Steganography

Steganographia is a book on steganography, written in c. 1499 by the German Benedictine abbot and polymath Johannes Trithemius.

== General ==
Trithemius' most famous work, Steganographia (written c.1499; published Frankfurt, 1606), was placed on the Index Librorum Prohibitorum in 1609 and removed in 1900. This book is in three volumes, and appears to be about magic—specifically, about using spirits to communicate over long distances. However, since the publication of a decryption key to the first two volumes in 1606, they were discovered to be actually concerned with cryptography and steganography. Until 1996, the third volume was widely believed to be solely about magic, but the "magical" formulas have now been shown to be covertexts for yet more material on cryptography.

== Reception ==
References within the third book to magical works by such figures as Agrippa and John Dee still lend credence to the idea of a mystic-magical foundation of the third volume. Additionally, while Trithemius's steganographic methods can be established to be free of the need for angelic–astrological mediation, an underlying theological motive for their contrivance remains. The preface to Polygraphia equally establishes the everyday practicability of cryptography, and was conceived by Trithemius as a "secular consequent of the ability of a soul specially empowered by God to reach, by magical means, from earth to Heaven". Robert Hooke suggested, in the chapter of Dr. Dee's Book of Spirits, that John Dee used Trithemian steganography to conceal his communication with Queen Elizabeth I.

== See also ==
- Greek Magical Papyri
- History of cryptography
