= Information leakage =

Revelation of secrets to unauthorized parties

Information leakage happens whenever a system that is designed to be closed to an eavesdropper reveals some information to unauthorized parties nonetheless. In other words, information leakage occurs when secret information correlates with, or can be correlated with, observable information. For example, when designing an encrypted instant messaging network, a network engineer without the capacity to crack encryption codes could see when messages are transmitted, even if they could not read them.

== Risk vectors ==
A modern example of information leakage is the leakage of secret information via data compression, by using variations in data compression ratio to reveal correlations between known (or deliberately injected) plaintext and secret data combined in a single compressed stream. Another example is the key leakage that can occur when using some public-key systems when cryptographic nonce values used in signing operations are insufficiently random. Bad randomness cannot protect proper functioning of a cryptographic system, even in a benign circumstance, it can easily produce crackable keys that cause key leakage.

Information leakage can sometimes be deliberate: for example, an algorithmic converter may be shipped that intentionally leaks small amounts of information, in order to provide its creator with the ability to intercept the users' messages, while still allowing the user to maintain an illusion that the system is secure. This sort of deliberate leakage is sometimes known as a subliminal channel.

Generally, only very advanced systems employ defences against information leakage.

Commonly implemented countermeasures include:

- Use steganography to hide the fact that a message is transmitted at all.
- Use chaffing to make it unclear to whom messages are transmitted (but this does not hide from others the fact that messages are transmitted).
- For busy re-transmitting proxies, such as a Mixmaster node: randomly delay and shuffle the order of outbound packets. This assists in disguising a given message's path, especially if there are multiple, popular forwarding nodes, such as are employed with Mixmaster mail forwarding.
- When a data value is no longer going to be used, erase it from the memory.

== See also ==
- Kleptographic attack
- Side-channel attack
- Traffic analysis
- Leakage (machine learning)
