= Theban alphabet =

Substitution cypher popular among modern occultists

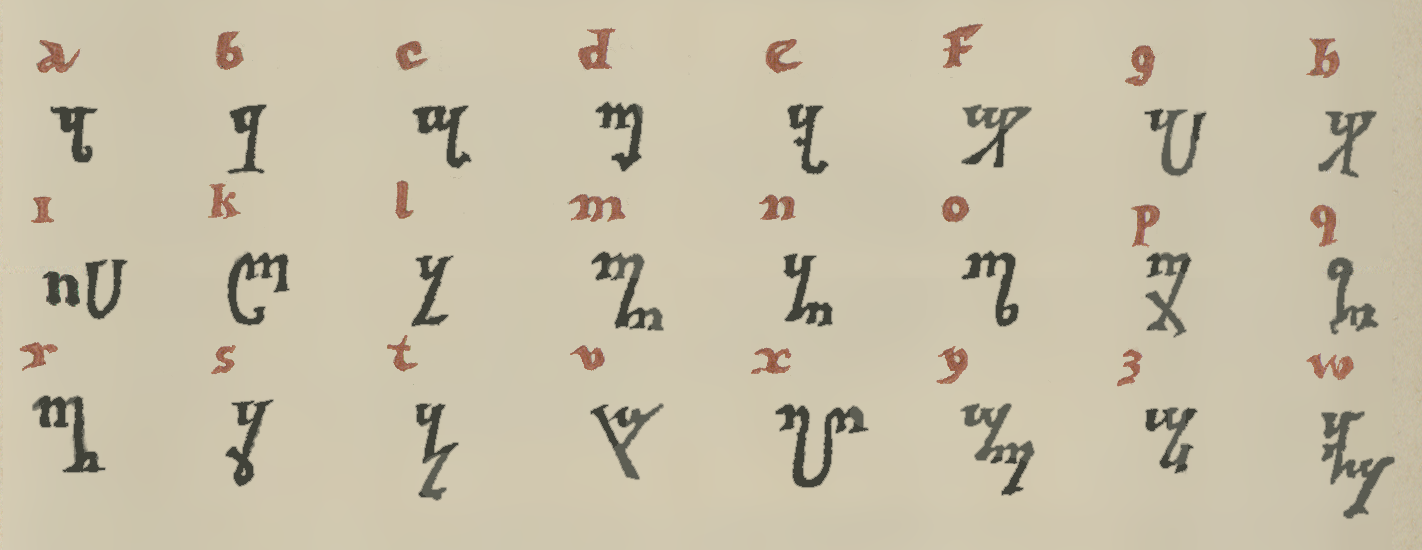
- Script type: Alphabet
- Creator: uncertain (above chart from Polygraphia, 1518, by Johannes Trithemius)
- Period: 16th century CE to present
- Direction: Left-to-right

Related scripts
- Parent systems: Latin alphabet (cipher): Theban alphabet

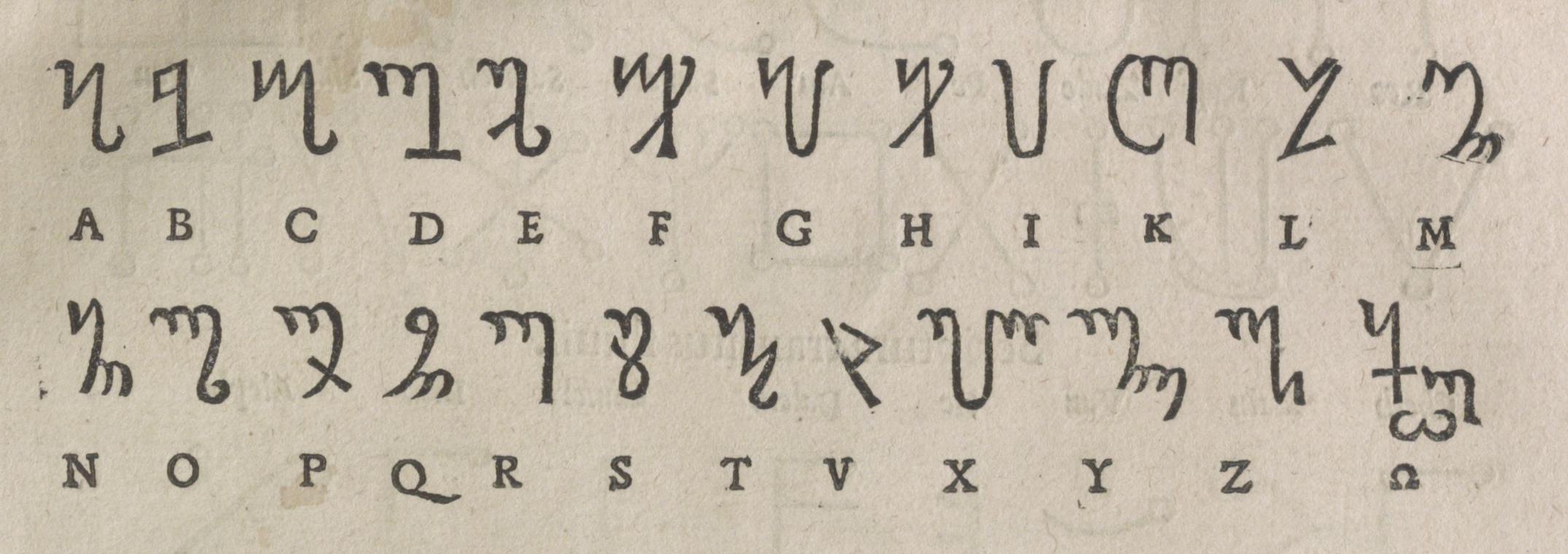
From Agrippa's Three Books of Occult Philosophy (1533). Note character changes, including "w" becoming incorporated into the last sign itself, denoted by capital-Omega (Ω) — a symbol for "End" — rather than "W".

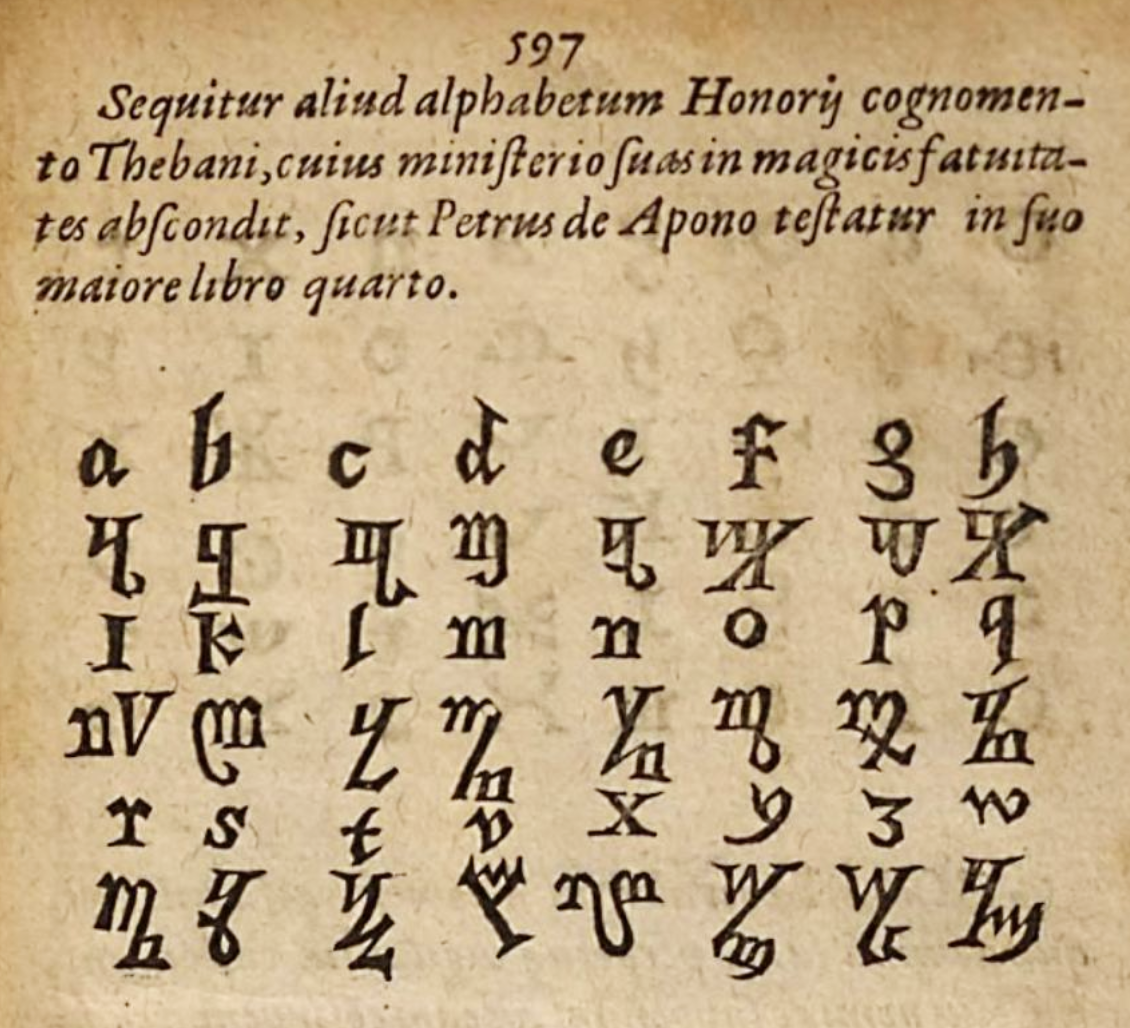
From the 1613 reprint of Polygraphia. Note changes to some characters, e.g. closed loops, and a left hook omitted from the symbol for W.

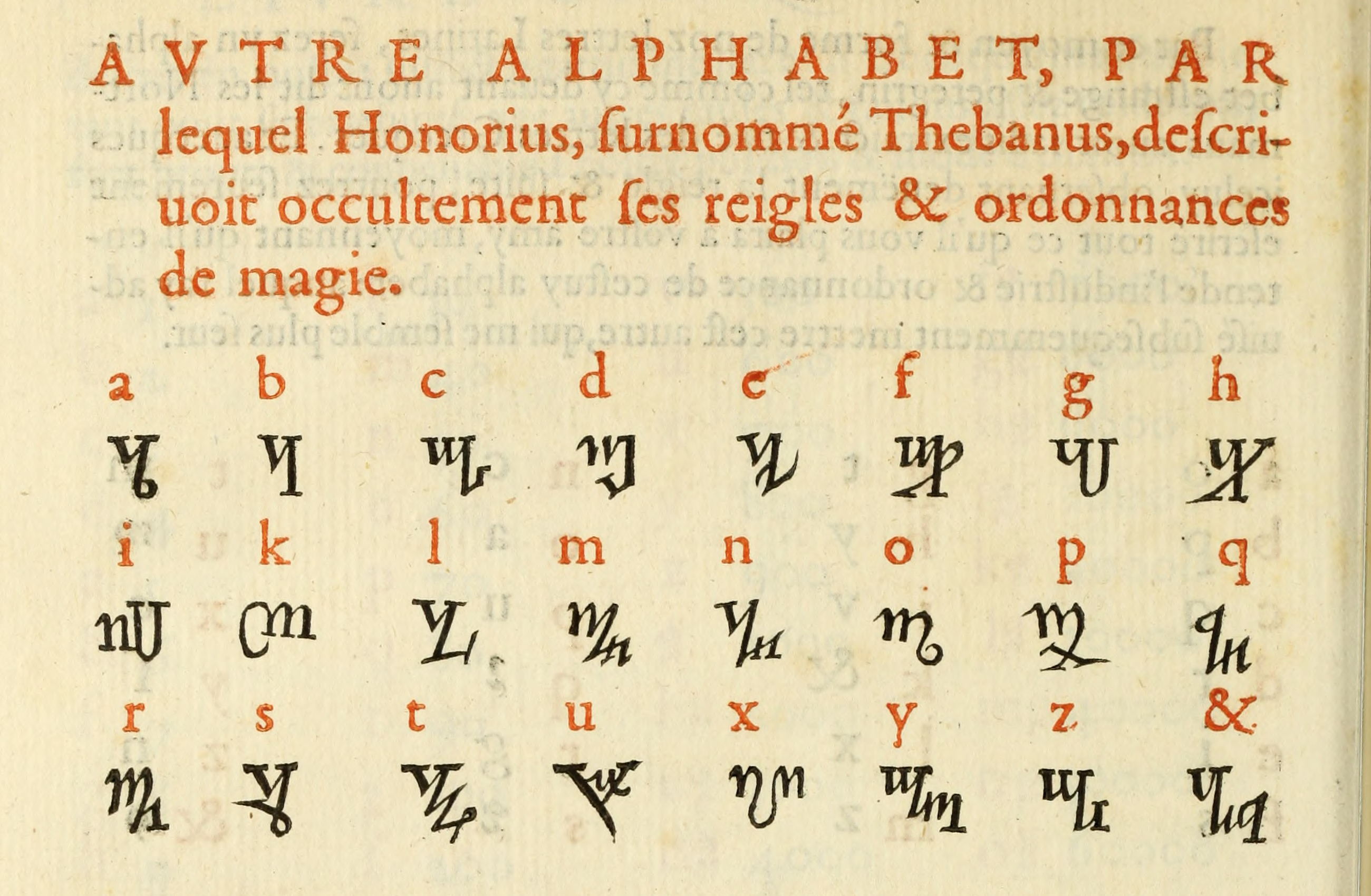
From Polygraphie (1561) by Gabriel de Collange (in French). W being a new letter and not used in France, that sign here represents the ampersand.

The Theban alphabet, also known as the witches' alphabet, is a writing system, specifically a substitution cipher of the Latin script, that was used by early modern occultists and is popular in the Wicca movement.

== Publication history ==
It was first published in Johannes Trithemius's Polygraphia (1518) in which it was attributed to Honorius of Thebes "as Pietro d'Abano testifies in his greater fourth book". However, it is not known to be mentioned in any of the writings attributed to D'Abano (1250–1316). Trithemius' student Heinrich Cornelius Agrippa (1486–1535) included it in his De Occulta Philosophia (Book III, chap. 29, 1533). It is also not known to be found in any manuscripts of the writings of Honorius of Thebes (e.g. Liber Iuratus Honorii, translated as The Sworn Book of Honorius), with the exception of the composite manuscript found in London, British Library Manuscript Sloane 3853, which however openly identifies Agrippa as its source.

== Uses and correlations ==
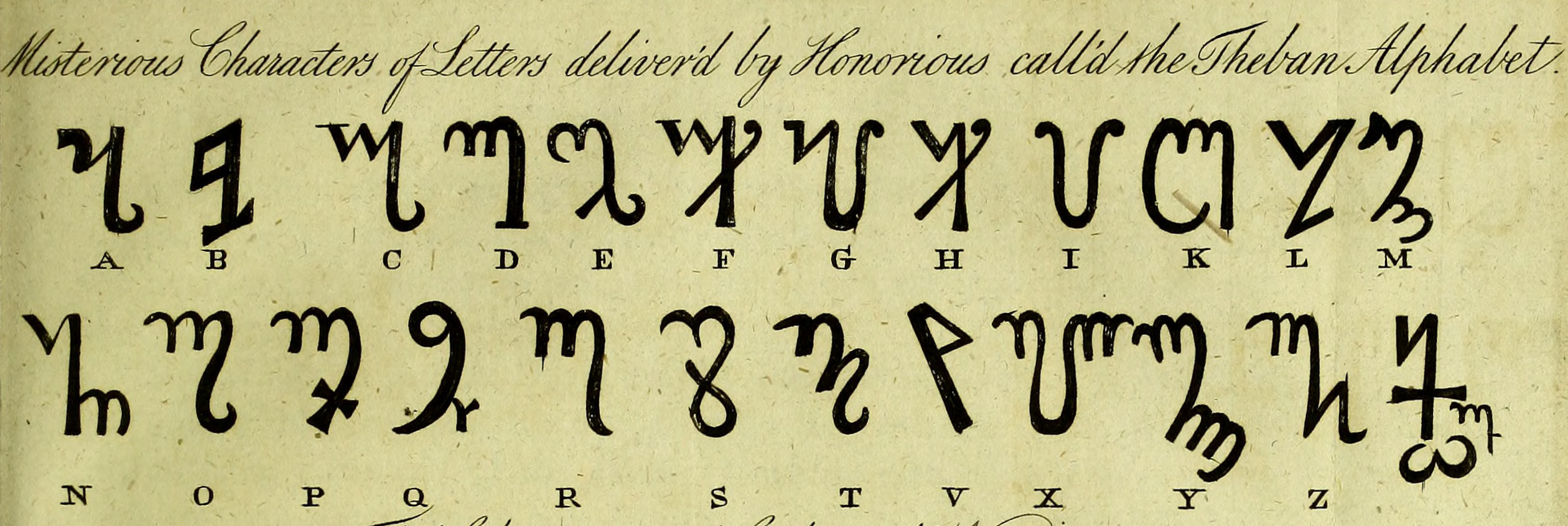
From The Magus (1801) by Francis Barrett. Follows Agrippa's chart above.

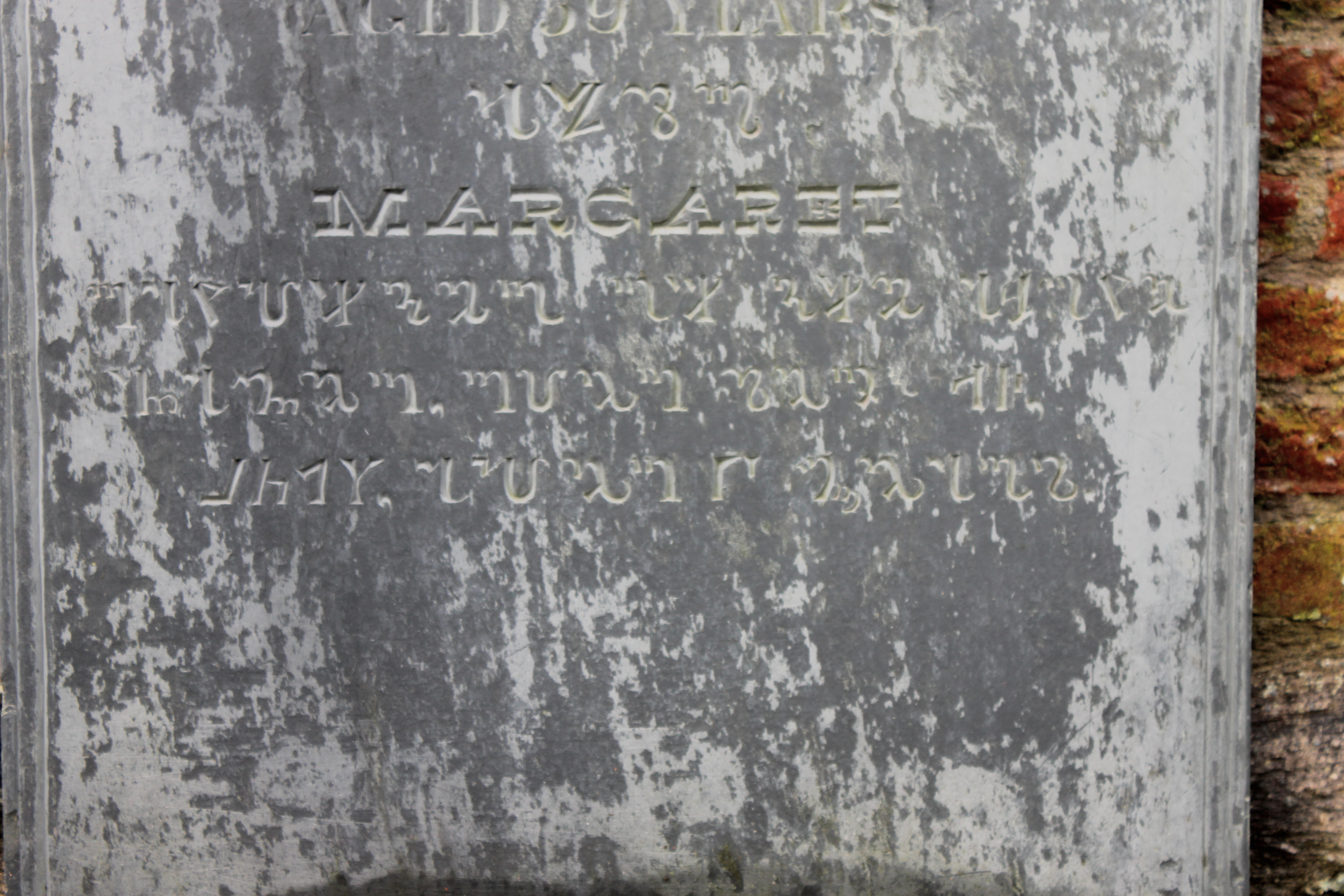
A 19th-century gravestone in Llanfyllin, Wales, inscribed in the Theban alphabet (Agrippa/Barrett version) and Cistercian numerals.

It is also known as the Honorian alphabet or the Runes of Honorius after the legendary magus (though Theban is dissimilar to the Germanic runic alphabet), or the witches' alphabet due to its use in modern Wicca and other forms of witchcraft as one of many substitution ciphers to hide magical writings such as the contents of a Book of Shadows from prying eyes. The Theban alphabet has not been found in any publications prior to that of Trithemius, and bears little visual resemblance to most other alphabets.

There is one-to-one correspondence between Theban and the letters in the old Latin alphabet. The modern characters J and U are not represented. They are often transliterated using the Theban characters for I and V, respectively. In the original chart by Trithemius, the letter W comes after Z, as it was a recent addition to the Latin alphabet, and did not yet have a standard position. This caused it to be misinterpreted as an ampersand or end-of-sentence mark by later translators and copyists, such as Francis Barrett. Some users of those later charts transliterate W using the Theban characters for VV, parallel to how the English letter developed. Some Theban letter shapes have changed from book to book over time. The Theban letters are unicameral.

Eric S. Raymond, an American software developer and author, has created a draft proposal for adding the Theban alphabet to the Universal Coded Character Set/Unicode.
