= 40-track mode =

Method for hiding data on a floppy disk

40-track mode is a steganographic technique that allows for hidden data on a 3.5 inch floppy diskette.

== Technical details ==
A disk sector (7) on a floppy diskette

A 3.5 inch 1.44MB mini-floppy diskette contains 80 tracks, 18 sectors per track, and 512 bytes per sector. A 3.5 inch 720k diskette contains 80 tracks, 9 sectors per track, and 512 bytes per sector. This technique refers to formatting an 80-track 1.44MB diskette as a special 40-track 720KB diskette.

In doing so one may create, in effect, two 40-track partitions. The former of these partitions is visible and usable as in a normal diskette, and the latter hidden.

One may then fill the unallocated (hidden) 40 tracks with up to 720KB of secret or encrypted data, that will not be superficially visible to a user.

Writing a 1.44MB floppy in 40-track mode causes the allocated tracks to be written to the actual even numbered tracks, thus causing drives attempting to read a 1.44MB diskette as a 720KB diskette to become confused because of the strange data in between even numbered tracks. The hidden data then resides on the odd numbered tracks.

Generally, device drivers only copy allocated data, and thus traditional copies of such a disk would generally not contain the hidden data.

Equivalents of this technique can easily be done on almost any media, for example, it is possible to hide audio in the pregap of the first track of a compact disc, or to hide data in the host protected area of a hard drive.

This technique is different than the "40th track" copy protection schemes used during the 80s and 90s.

== History ==
The KGB and senior FBI agent Robert Hanssen used this technique to communicate with one another between 1985 and 2001.
