= Polygraphia (book) =

1518 book by Johannes Trithemius about steganography

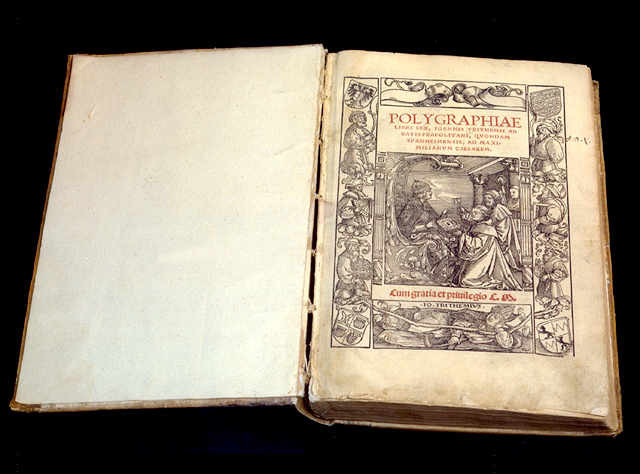
- Copy of Polygraphia
- Author: Johannes Trithemius
- Original title: Polygraphia
- Language: Latin
- Genre: Cryptographic, steganography
- Publication date: 1518
- Publication place: Germany
- English publication date: N/A
- Media type: Printed book
- Preceded by: Steganography

Polygraphia is a cryptographic work written by Johannes Trithemius published in 1518 dedicated to the art of steganography.

The full title is Polygraphiae libri sex, Ioannis Trithemii abbatis Peapolitani, quondam Spanheimensis, ad Maximilianum Caesarem [Six books of polygraphy, by Johannes Trithemius, abbot at Würzburg, formerly at Spanheim, for the Emperor Maximilian ].

It is the oldest known source of the popular witches' alphabet, used at large by modern traditions of witchcraft.

== Review ==
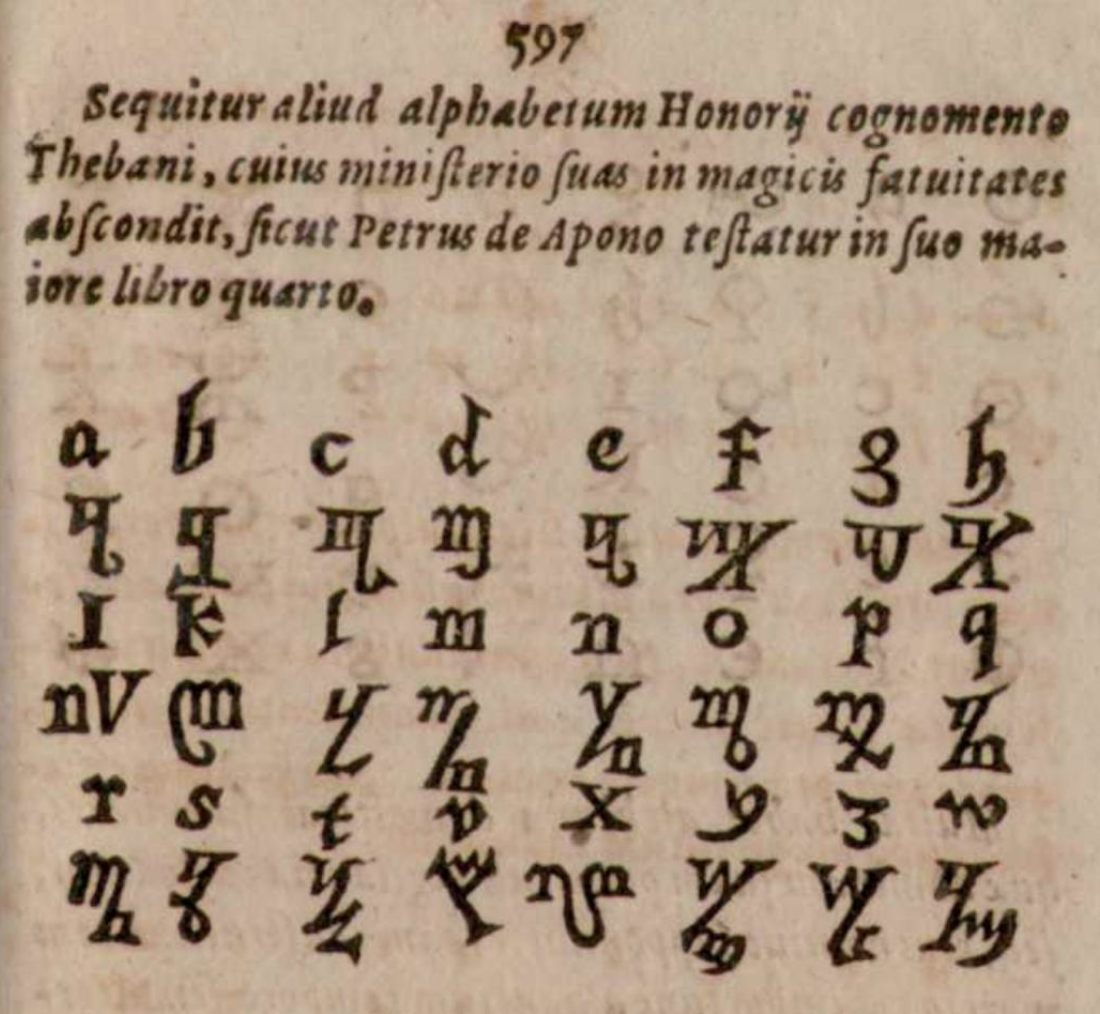
Example alphabet.

It is composed of six books and a decryption key.

- Book I contains no fewer than 384 alphabets (called "minutiae" by the author) of 24 letters (or "degrees"): each letter corresponds to a Latin word (noun, verb, adjective, etc.) in reference to Christian prayers and religious texts, being in total 9,216 different words. This is nowadays known as the Ave Maria cipher, which mostly uses only a few of the first alphabets.
- Book II contains 308 more Latin alphabets with 7,392 words, again using Latin words with mostly religious context.
- Book III presents 132 alphabets in three columns which are 3,168 dictions of a "universal language" where each letter is equivalent to an invented word (for example "a" could be Abra, mada, badar, cadalan, pasa etc.) but capable of expressing numbers (from 1 to 10 would be Abra, Abre, Abri, Abro, Abru, Abras, Abres, Abris, Abros and Abrus).
- Book IV shows 2,880 invented alphabet dictions in 120 alphabets. To decode, one must simply extract the second letter of each word.
- Book V reproduces two canonical hash tables, one direct with 80 alphabets and the other inverted with 98 alphabets, allowing infinite permutations, to which twelve "planispheric wheels" each comprising six categories of 24 numbers combined with the 24 letters and thus allowing a big amount of elaborate ciphered messages.
- Book VI is a collection of (partly alleged) ancient alphabets, including Germanic-Franconian, Ethiopian, Norman, Magical and Alchemical.

The work ends with alphabets of his invention such as the "tetragramaticus" formed by 4 characters that are diversified in 24 letters, and the "enagramaticus" of 9 characters and 28 letters, of which he gives examples of writing that seemingly belongs to a natural language.

== Versions ==
1518: The original version written by Johannes Trithemius;

1550: From the workshop of Cyriacus Jacobus (Ex officina Cyriaci Iacobi);

1551: French translation by Gabriel de Collange, funded by the bookseller Jacques Kerver. Due to its age, the French used is archaic and is not spoken by French people today;

2024: Spanish translation by Manolo García Álvarez, edited by Soliman El-Azir.

== Relationship with Steganographia ==
According to some scholars, both books, Steganographia and Polygraphia, are but a single work presented in two parts: the first is metaphysical and quite theoretical (it even hides a complete treatise on "angelology", or the study of angels with their names and hierarchies, between its pages), the second is more practical and is used for encoding messages.

== See also ==
- History of cryptography
- Johannes Trithemius
- Polygraphia Nova
