= Microdot =

Steganograph method of hiding messages

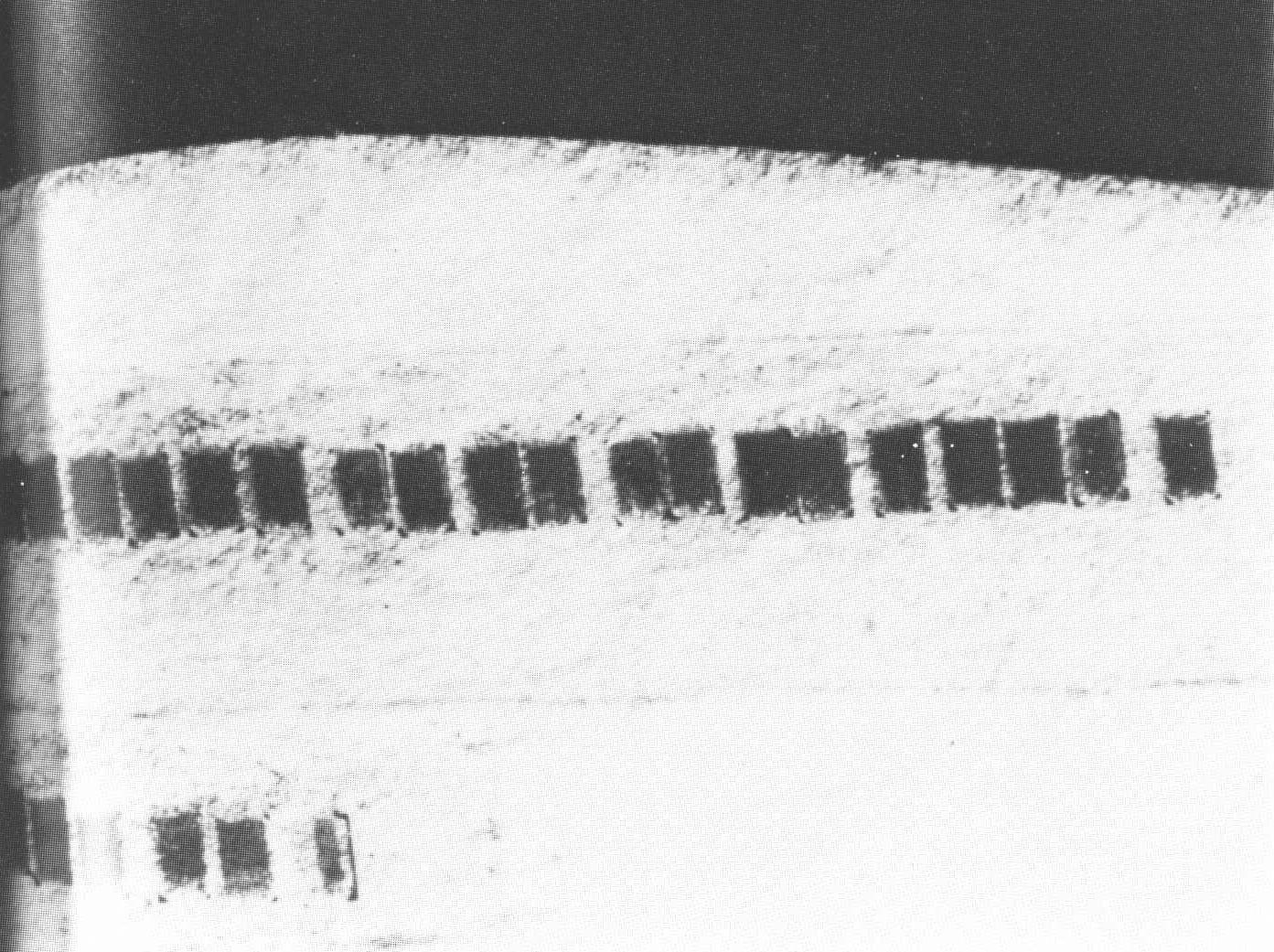
NSA photo of microdots taped inside the label of an envelope. The envelope was sent by German spies in Mexico City to Lisbon during World War II, but was intercepted by Allied intelligence.

A microdot is text or an image substantially reduced in size to prevent detection by unintended recipients. Microdots are normally circular and around 1 millimetre (0.039 in) in diameter but can be made into different shapes and sizes and made from various materials such as polyester or metal. The name comes from microdots often having been about the size and shape of a typographical dot, such as a period or the tittle of a lowercase i or j. Microdots are, fundamentally, a steganographic approach to message protection.

== History ==
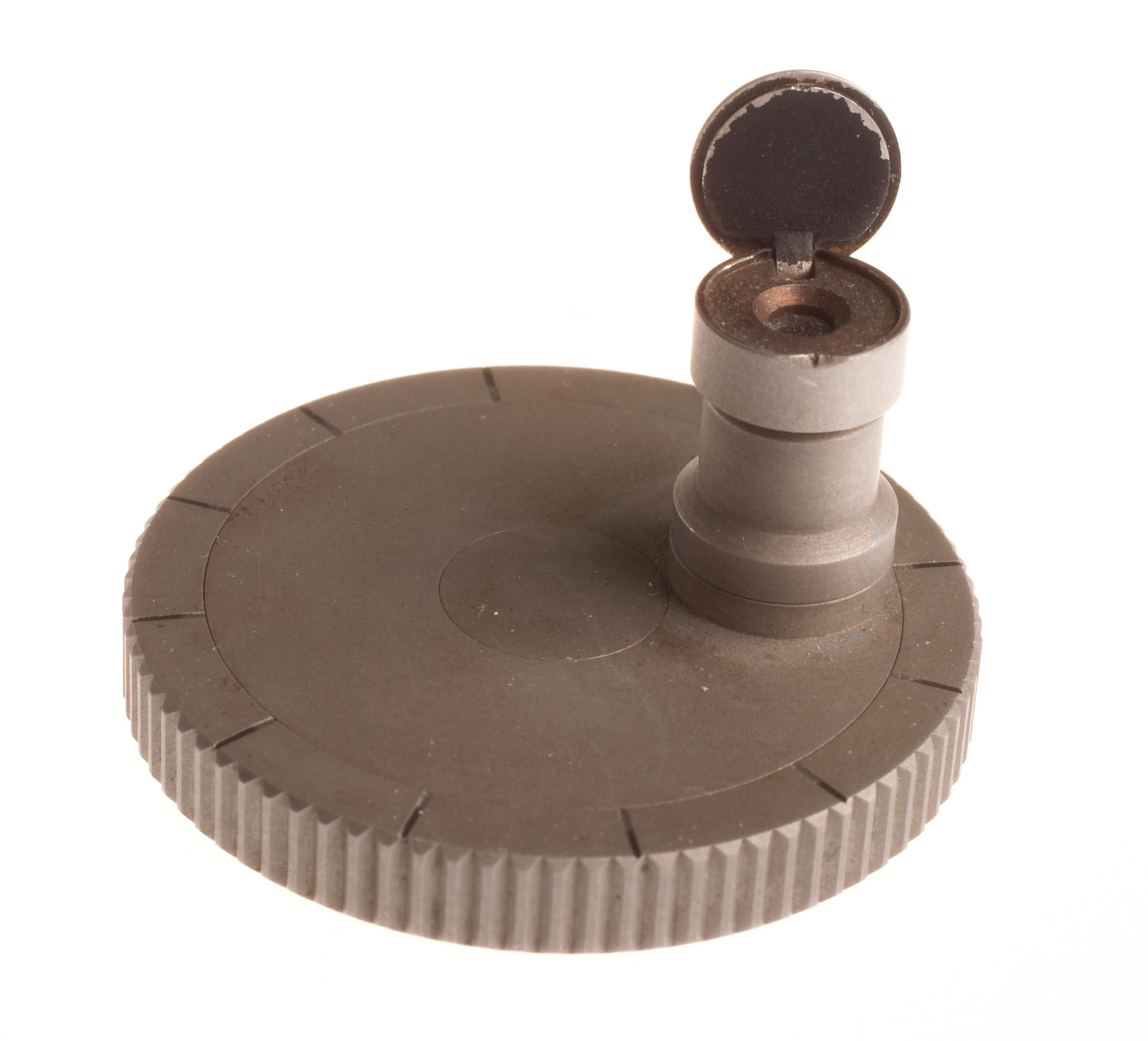
Mark IV microdot camera

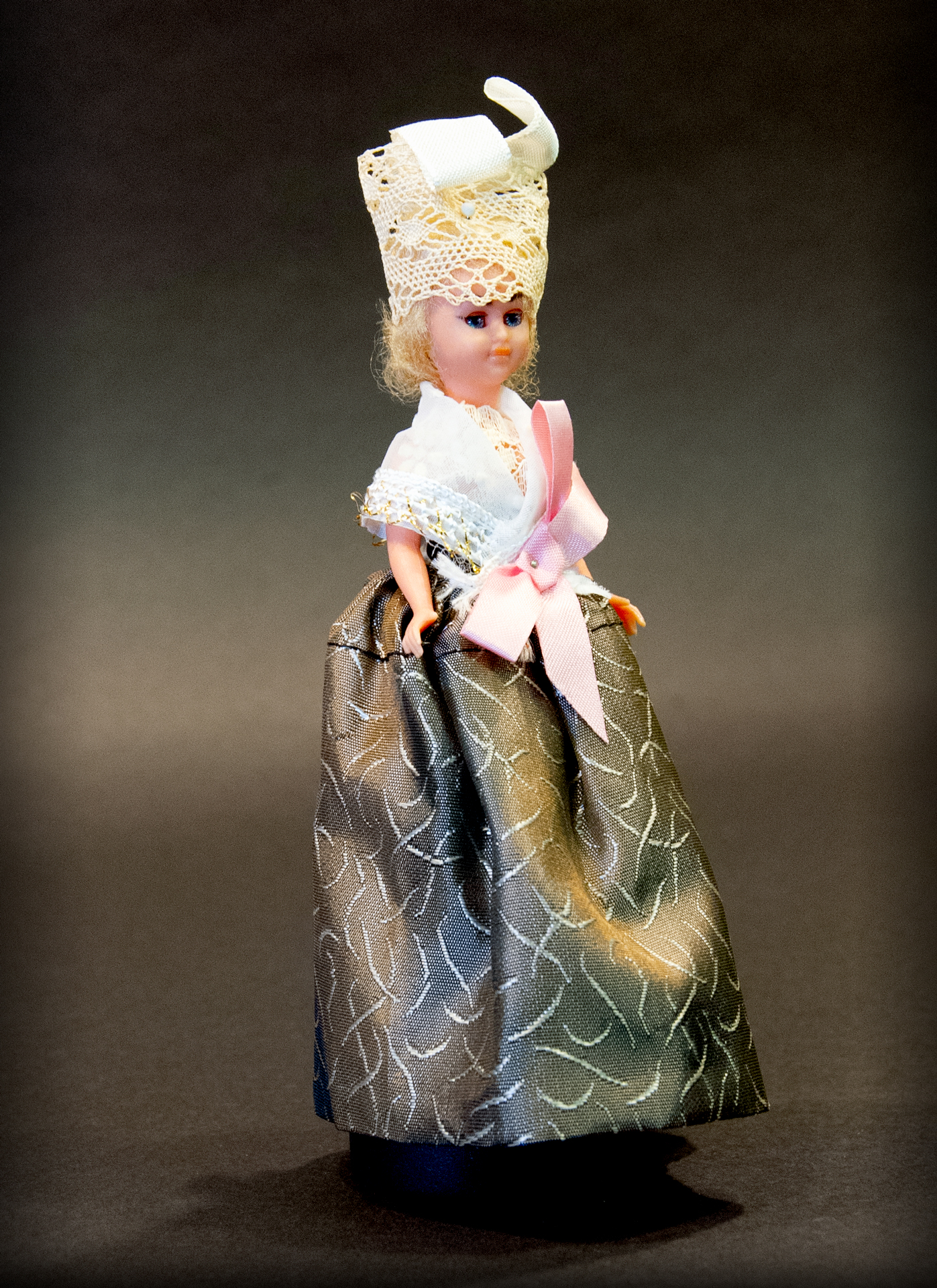
A doll used by a German spy to smuggle microdot photographs to Nazi Germany until the spy's arrest in 1942. (FBI collection)

In 1870 during the Franco-Prussian War, Paris was under siege and messages were sent by carrier pigeon. Parisian photographer René Dagron used microfilm to permit each pigeon to carry a high volume of messages, as pigeons can carry little weight.

Improvement in technology since then has made even smaller miniaturization possible.

At the 1925 International Congress of Photography in Paris, Emanuel Goldberg presented a method of producing extreme reduction microdots using a two-stage process. First, an initial reduced negative was made, then the image of the negative was projected from the eyepiece of a modified microscope onto a collodium emulsion where the microscope specimen slide would be. The reduction was such that a page of text would be legibly reproduced in an area of 0.01 mm^{2}. This density is comparable to the entire text of the Bible fifty times over in one square inch (around 6.5 cm^{2}). Goldberg's "Mikrat" (microdot) was prominently reported at the time in English, French and German publications.

A technique comparable to modern microdots for steganographic purposes was first used in Germany during the Interwar period. It was also later used by many countries to pass messages through insecure postal channels. Later microdot techniques used film with aniline dye, rather than silver halide layers, as this was even harder for counter-espionage agents to find.

A popular article on espionage by J. Edgar Hoover in the Reader's Digest in 1946 attributed invention of microdots to "the famous Professor Zapp at the Technical University Dresden". This article was reprinted, translated, and widely and uncritically cited in the literature on espionage. There never was a Professor Zapp at that university; Hoover's Zapp has been wrongly identified with Walter Zapp, inventor of the Minox camera, which was used by spies but did not make microdots. Hoover appears to have conflated Emanuel Goldberg, who was a professor in Dresden, with Kurt Zapp who, late in World War II, was in Dresden and taught spies how to make microdots.

== Modern usage ==
Microdot identification is a process in which tiny identification tags are etched or coded with a unique serial number or, for use on vehicles, with a vehicle identification number (VIN) or asset identification number. In South Africa it is a legal requirement to have a microdot fitted to all new vehicles sold since September 2012 and to all vehicles that require police clearance.

Some printers print, in addition to the document contents requested, tiny yellow dots containing the printer serial number and a time stamp.

A system for reducing the theft of stone paving used by Leeds City Council makes use of microdot technology.

== See also ==
- Photolithography
