= Johannes Trithemius =

German Benedictine abbot and polymath (1462–1516)

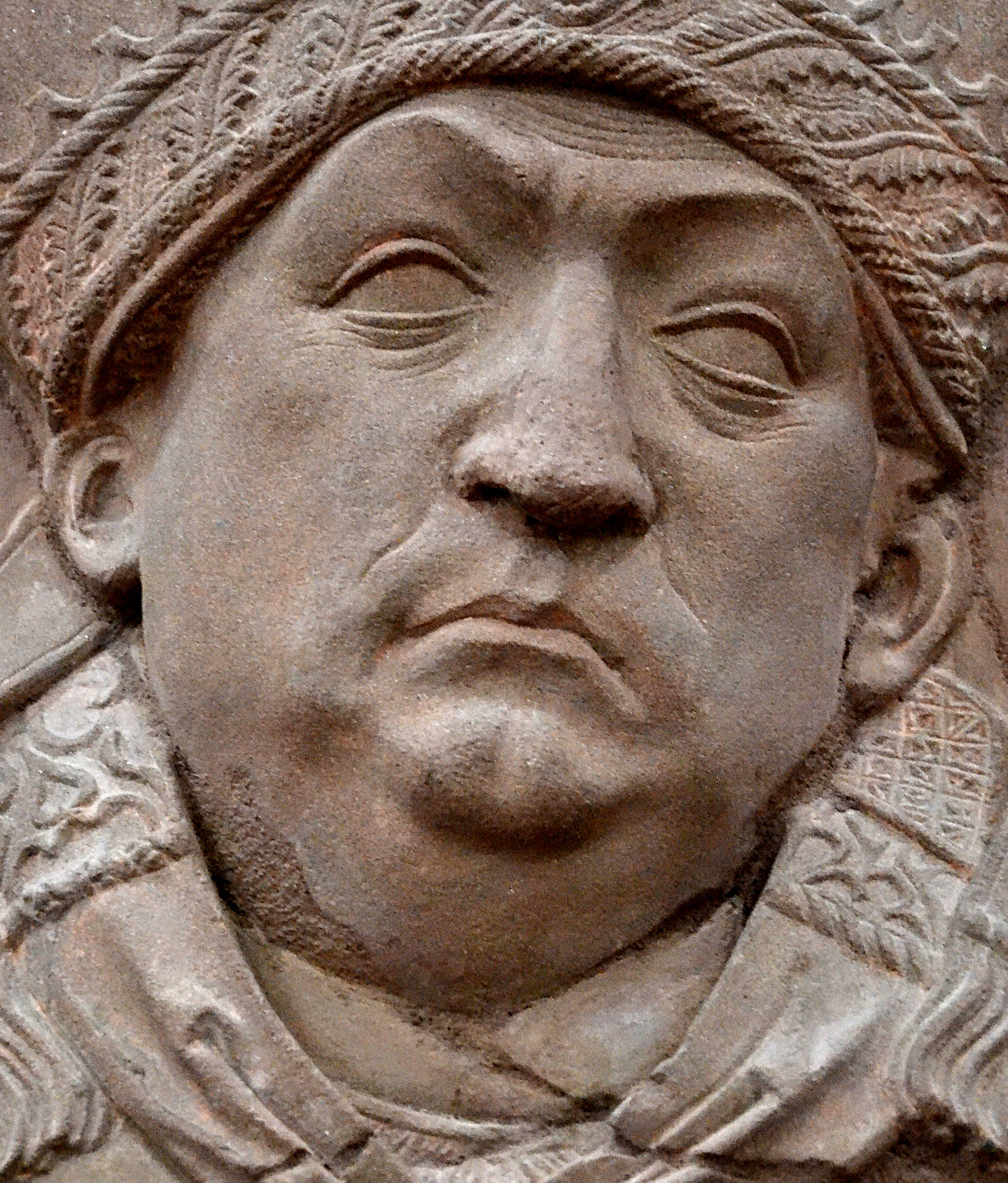
- Detail of Tomb Relief of Johannes Trithemius by Tilman Riemenschneider
- Born: 1 February 1462; Trittenheim, Electorate of Trier, Holy Roman Empire (now Rhineland-Palatinate, Germany)
- Died: 13 December 1516 (aged 54); Würzburg, Prince-Bishopric of Würzburg, Holy Roman Empire (now Bavaria, Germany)
- Education: University of Heidelberg
- Known for: Steganographia; polygraphiae; Trithemius cipher
- Scientific career
- Fields: Theology; cryptography; lexicography; history; occultism
- Workplaces: Benedictine abbey of Sponheim; St. Jakob zu den Schotten
- Notable students: Heinrich Cornelius Agrippa; Paracelsus

Johannes Trithemius (/trɪˈθɛmiəs/; 1 February 1462 – 13 December 1516), born Johann Heidenberg, was a German Benedictine abbot and a polymath who was active in the German Renaissance as a lexicographer, chronicler, cryptographer, and occultist. He is considered the founder of modern cryptography (a claim shared with Leon Battista Alberti) and steganography, as well as the founder of bibliography and literary studies as branches of knowledge. He had considerable influence on the development of early modern and modern occultism. His students included Heinrich Cornelius Agrippa and Paracelsus.

== Early life ==
The byname Trithemius refers to his native town of Trittenheim on the Moselle River, at the time part of the Electorate of Trier.

When Johannes was still an infant his father, Johann von Heidenburg, died. His stepfather, whom his mother Elisabeth married seven years later, was hostile to education and thus Johannes could only learn in secret and with many difficulties. He learned Greek, Latin, and Hebrew. When he was 17 years old he escaped from his home and wandered around looking for good teachers, travelling to Trier, Cologne, the Netherlands, and Heidelberg. He studied at the University of Heidelberg.

== Career ==
Travelling from the university to his home town in 1482, he was surprised by a snowstorm and took refuge in the Benedictine abbey of Sponheim near Bad Kreuznach. He decided to stay and was elected abbot in 1483 at the age of 21. He often served as featured speaker and chapter secretary at the Bursfelde Congregation's annual chapter from 1492 to 1503, the annual meeting of reform-minded abbots. Trithemius also supervised the visits of the congregation's abbeys.

Trithemius wrote extensively as a historian, starting with a chronicle of Sponheim and culminating in a two-volume work on the history of Hirsau Abbey. His work was distinguished by mastery of the Latin language and eloquent phrasing, yet it was soon discovered that he inserted several fictional passages into his works. Even during Trithemius's lifetime, several critics pointed out the invented sources he used. His forgery regarding the connection between the Franks and the Trojans was part of a larger project to establish a link between the current dynasty of Austria with ancient heroes. While his colleagues like Jakob Mennel and Ladislaus Suntheim often inserted invented ancestors in their works, Trithemius invented entire sources, such as Hunibald, supposedly a Scythian historian. For his research on monasteries, he utilized "Meginfrid", an imagined early chronicler of Fulda and Meginfrid's nonexistent treatise De temporibus gratiae to substantiate Trithemius's ideal of monastic piety and erudition, which were supposed to be the same values shared by the monks of the ninth century. Others opine that Meginfrid was not strictly forgery but the combination of wishful thinking with faulty memory.

In the process though, Trithemius became a famous builder of libraries, which he created in Sponheim and Würzburg. In Sponheim, he set out to transform the abbey from a neglected and undisciplined place into a centre of learning. In his time, the abbey library increased from around fifty items to more than two thousand.

His efforts did not meet with praise, and his reputation as a magician did not further his acceptance. Increasing differences with the convent led to his resignation in 1506, when he decided to take up the offer of the Bishop of Würzburg, Lorenz von Bibra (bishop from 1495 to 1519), to become the abbot of St. James's Abbey, the Schottenkloster in Würzburg. He remained there until the end of his life.

Trithemius seemed to have a falling out with Maximilian regarding their differences when the emperor wanted to organize a separate ecclesiastical council in 1511, in slight of Pope Julius II. The relationship recovered after Julius's death, though.

The German polymath, physician, legal scholar, soldier, theologian, and occult writer Heinrich Cornelius Agrippa (1486–1535) and the Swiss physician, alchemist, and astrologer Paracelsus (1493–1541) were among his pupils.

== Death ==
Trithemius was buried in St. James's Abbey's church; a tombstone by the famous Tilman Riemenschneider was erected in his honor. In 1825, the tombstone was moved to the Neumünster church, next to the cathedral. It was damaged in the firebombing of 1945, and subsequently restored by the workshop of Theodor Spiegel.

== The Faust legend ==
Trithemius had a reputation as a necromancer. The Faust legend is strongly based on a legend involving Maximilian of Austria, his first wife Mary of Burgundy and Trithemius. Through his 1507 account, Trithemius was the first author who mentioned the historical Doctor Faustus, or Johann Faust of Knittlingen. In a letter he wrote to the polymath Heinrich Cornelius Agrippa, another famous occult writer and supposed magician – he appeared to criticize the vanity of Faust, who possessed inferior skills and went against the teachings of the church. Literary scholar Andrew McCarthy opines that Trithemius considered himself a true necromancer, who studied in order to gain knowledge of the workings of the universe without attracting publicity.

Being summoned to the emperor's court in 1506 and 1507, he also helped to "prove" Maximilian's Trojan origins. In the 1569 edition of his Tischreden, Martin Luther writes about a magician and necromancer, understood to be Trithemius, who summoned Alexander the Great and other ancient heroes, as well as the emperor's deceased wife Mary of Burgundy, to entertain Maximilian. In his 1585 account, Augustin Lercheimer (1522–1603) writes that after Mary's death, Trithemius was summoned to console a devastated Maximilian. Trithemius conjured a shade of Mary, who looked exactly like her when alive. Maximilian also recognized a birthmark on her neck, that only he knew about. He was distraught by the experience though, and ordered Trithemius never to do it again. An anonymous account in 1587 modified the story into a less sympathetic version. The emperor became Charles V, who, despite knowing about the risk of black magic, ordered Faustus to raise Alexander and his wife from death. Charles saw that the woman had a birthmark, which he had heard about. Later, the woman in Goethe's Faust became Helen of Troy. The story of Maximilian, Mary of Burgundy and the Abbot "Johannes Trithem" later appeared as one of the Grimms' Tales.

According to John Henry Jones, the blooming of the Faustus myth was fuelled by the witch craze of the time.

== Steganographia ==
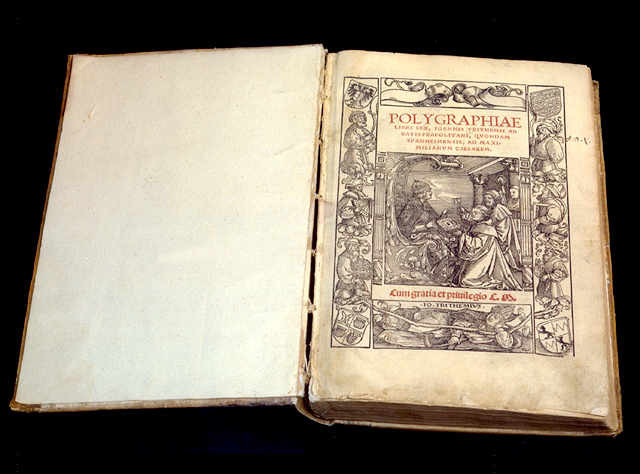
Polygraphiae (1518) – the first printed book on cryptography

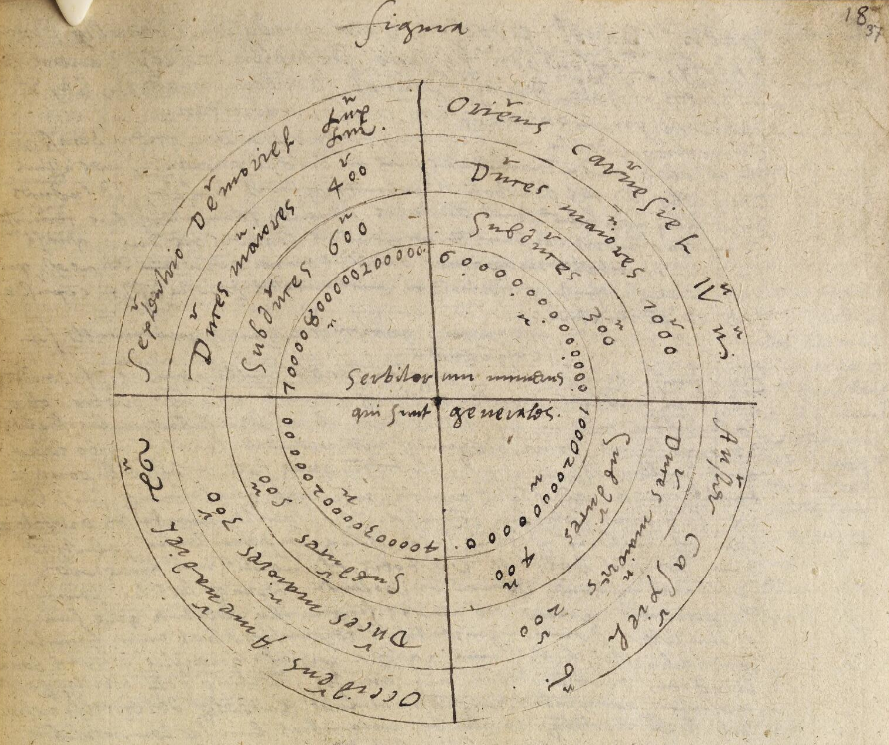
A chart from Steganographia copied by John Dee in 1591

Trithemius' most famous work, Steganographia (written c. 1499; published Frankfurt, 1606), was placed on the Index Librorum Prohibitorum in 1609 and removed in 1900. This book is in three volumes, and appears to be about magic—specifically, about using spirits to communicate over long distances. Since the publication of the decryption key to the first two volumes in 1606, they have been known to be actually concerned with cryptography and steganography. Until the 1990s, the third volume was widely still believed to be solely about magic, but the "magical" formulae have now been shown to be covertexts for yet more cryptographic content. However, mentions of the magical work within the third book by such figures as Agrippa and John Dee still lend credence to the idea of a mystic-magical foundation concerning the third volume. Additionally, while Trithemius's steganographic methods can be established to be free of the need for angelic–astrological mediation, still left intact is an underlying theological motive for their contrivance. The preface to the Polygraphia equally establishes that the everyday practicability of cryptography was conceived by Trithemius as a "secular consequent of the ability of a soul specially empowered by God to reach, by magical means, from earth to Heaven". Robert Hooke suggested, in the chapter Of Dr. Dee's Book of Spirits, that John Dee made use of Trithemian steganography to conceal his communication with Queen Elizabeth I. Amongst the codes used in this book is the Ave Maria cipher, where each coded letter is replaced by a short sentence about Jesus in Latin.

The reason for Polygraphia and Steganographia as covertexts being written are unknown. Possible explanations are that either its real target audience was the selected few such as Maximilian, or that Trithemius wanted to attract public attention to a tedious field.

== Works ==
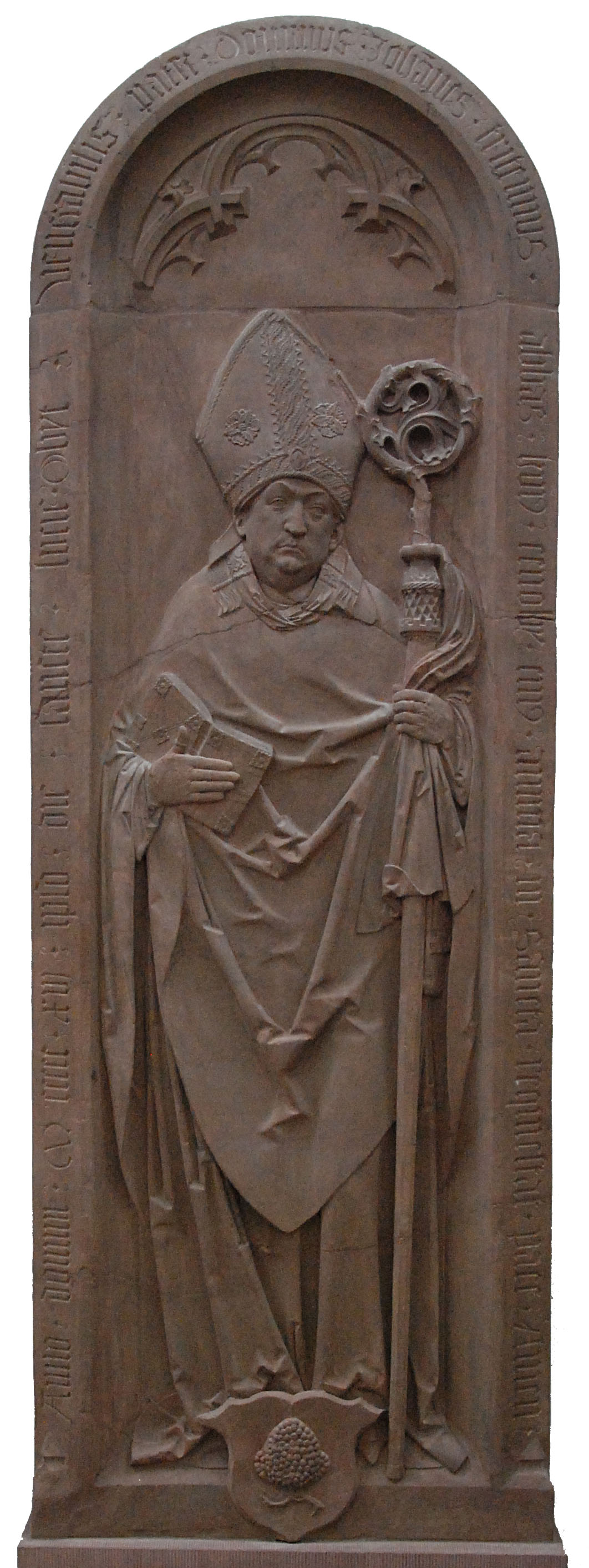
Tomb relief of Johannes Trithemius by Tilman Riemenschneider

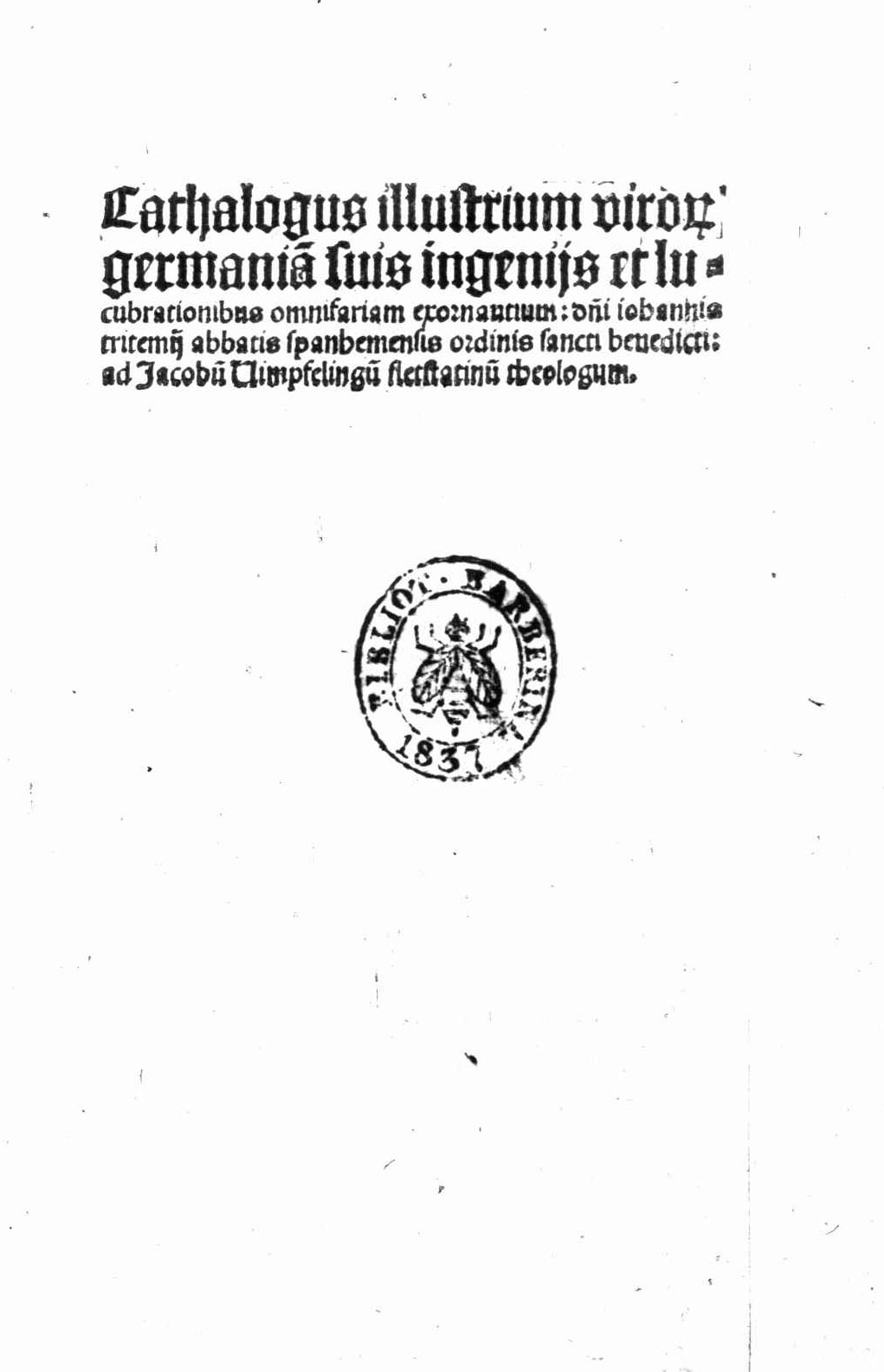
Catalogus illustrium virorum Germaniae, 1495

- Exhortationes ad monachos, 1486
- De institutione vitae sacerdotalis, 1486
- De regimine claustralium, 1486
- De visitatione monachorum, about 1490
- Catalogus illustrium virorum Germaniae, 1491–1495
- De laude scriptorum manualium, 1492 (printed 1494) Zum Lob der Schreiber; Freunde Mainfränkischer Kunst and Geschichte e. V., Würzburg 1973, (Latin/German)
- De viris illustribus ordinis sancti Benedicti, 1492
- In laudem et commendatione Ruperti quondam abbatis Tuitiensis, 1492
- De origine, progressu et laudibus ordinis fratrum Carmelitarum, 1492
- Liber penthicus seu lugubris de statu et ruina ordinis monastici, 1493
- De proprietate monachorum, before 1494
- De vanitate et miseria humanae vitae, before 1494
- Liber de scriptoribus ecclesiasticis, 1494
- De laudibus sanctissimae matris Annae, 1494
- De scriptoribus ecclesiasticis, 1494
- Chronicon Hirsaugiense, 1495–1503
- Chronicon Sponheimense, c. 1495-1509 - Chronik des Klosters Sponheim, 1024-1509; Eigenverlag Carl Velten, Bad Kreuznach 1969 (German)
- De cura pastorali, 1496
- De duodecim excidiis oberservantiae regularis, 1496
- De triplici regione claustralium et spirituali exercitio monachorum, 1497
- Steganographia, c. 1499
- Chronicon successionis ducum Bavariae et comitum Palatinorum, c. 1500-1506
- Nepiachus, 1507
- De septem secundeis id est intelligentiis sive spiritibus orbes post deum moventibus, c. 1508 (The Seven Secondary Intelligences, 1508), a history of the world based on astrology;
- Antipalus maleficiorum, 1508
- Polygraphia, written 1508, published 1518
- Annales Hirsaugienses, 1509–1514. The full title is Annales hirsaugiensis...complectens historiam Franciae et Germaniae, gesta imperatorum, regum, principum, episcoporum, abbatum, et illustrium virorum, Latin for "The Annals of Hirsau...including the history of France and Germany, the exploits of the emperors, kings, princes, bishops, abbots, and illustrious men". Hirsau was a monastery near Württemberg, whose abbot commissioned the work in 1495, but it took Trithemius until 1514 to finish the two-volume, 1,400-page work. It was first printed in 1690. Some consider this work to be one of the first humanist history books.
- Compendium sive breviarium primi voluminis chronicarum sive annalium de origine regum et gentis Francorum, c. 1514
- De origine gentis Francorum compendium, 1514 - An abridged history of the Franks / Johannes Trithemius; AQ-Verlag, Dudweiler 1987; ISBN 978-3-922441-52-6 (Latin/English)
- Liber octo quaestionum, 1515

Compilations

- Marquard Freher, Opera historica, Minerva, Frankfurt/Main, 1966
- Johannes Busaeus, Opera pia et spiritualia (1604 and 1605)
- Johannes Busaeus, Paralipomena opuscolorum (1605 and 1624)

== See also ==
- Augustus the Younger, Duke of Brunswick-Lüneburg
- Humanism in Germany
- Minuscule 96 – written by the hand of Trithemius
- Tabula recta
- Trithemius cipher
- Theban alphabet

== Sources ==
- Brann, Noël L. (1981). The Abbot Trithemius (1462-1516): The Renaissance of Monastic Humanism. Studies in the History of Christian Traditions. Vol. 24. Brill. ISBN 978-90-04-06468-3. LCCN 82125202. OCLC 8088783. OL 3035882M.
- Grafton, Anthony (2009a). Worlds Made by Words: Scholarship and Community in the Modern West. Harvard University Press. ISBN 978-0-674-03257-6.
- Grafton, Anthony (30 June 2009b). Christianity and the Transformation of the Book: Origen, Eusebius, and the Library of Caesarea. Harvard University Press. ISBN 978-0-674-03786-1.
