= Steganography =

Hiding messages in other messages

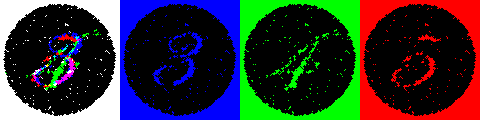
The same image viewed by white, blue, green, and red lights reveals different hidden numbers.

Steganography (/ˌstɛɡ.ə.ˈnɒɡ.rəf.i/, STEG-ə-NOG-rə-fee) is the practice of representing information within another message or physical object, in such a manner that the presence of the concealed information would not be evident to an unsuspecting person's examination. In computing and electronic contexts, a computer file, message, image, or video is concealed within another file, message, image, or video. Generally, the hidden messages appear to be (or to be part of) something else: images, articles, shopping lists, or some other cover text. For example, the hidden message may be in invisible ink between the visible lines of a private letter. Some implementations of steganography that lack a formal shared secret are forms of security through obscurity, while key-dependent steganographic schemes try to adhere to Kerckhoffs's principle.

The word steganography comes from Greek steganographia, which combines the words steganós (στεγανός), meaning "covered or concealed", and -graphia (γραφή) meaning "writing". The first recorded use of the term was in 1499 by Johannes Trithemius in his Steganographia, a treatise on cryptography and steganography, disguised as a book on magic.

The advantage of steganography over cryptography alone is that the intended secret message does not attract attention to itself as an object of scrutiny. Plainly visible encrypted messages, no matter how unbreakable they are, arouse interest and may in themselves be incriminating in countries in which encryption is illegal. Whereas cryptography is the practice of protecting the contents of a message alone, steganography is concerned with concealing both the fact that a secret message is being sent and its contents.

Steganography includes the concealment of information within computer files. In digital steganography, electronic communications may include steganographic coding inside a transport layer, such as a document file, image file, program, or protocol. Media files are ideal for steganographic transmission because of their large size. For example, a sender might start with an innocuous image file and adjust the color of every hundredth pixel to correspond to a letter in the alphabet. The change is so subtle that someone who is not looking for it is unlikely to notice the change.

== History ==
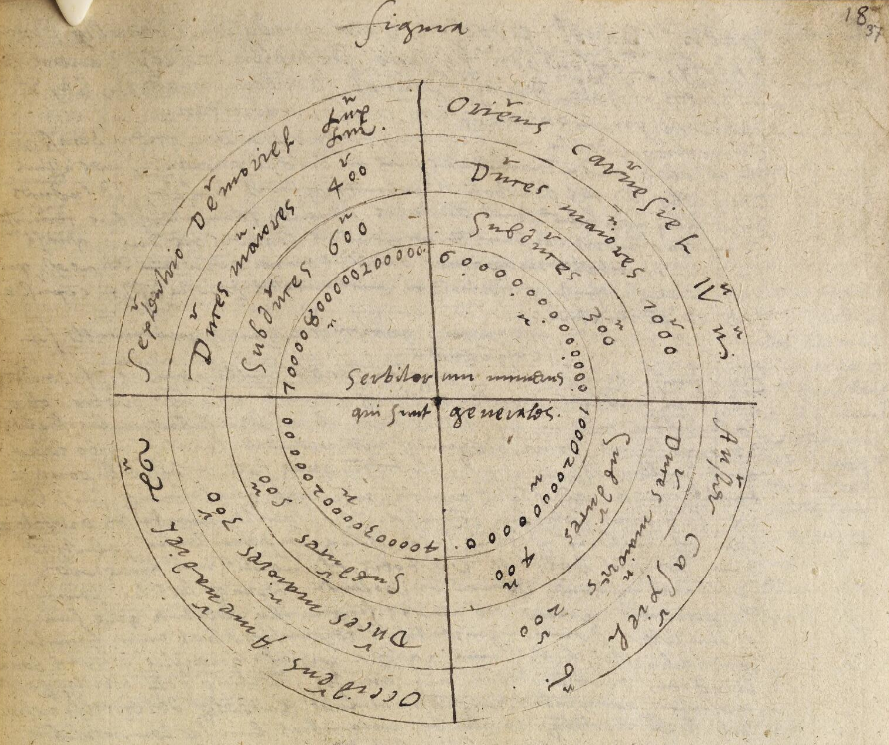
A chart from Johannes Trithemius's Steganographia copied by Dr John Dee in 1591

The first recorded uses of steganography can be traced back to 440 BC in Greece, when Herodotus mentions two examples in his Histories. Histiaeus sent a message to his vassal, Aristagoras, by shaving the head of his most trusted servant, "marking" the message onto his scalp, then sending him on his way once his hair had regrown, with the instruction, "When thou art come to Miletus, bid Aristagoras shave thy head, and look thereon." Additionally, Demaratus sent a warning about a forthcoming attack to Greece by writing it directly on the wooden backing of a wax tablet before applying its beeswax surface. Wax tablets were in common use then as reusable writing surfaces, sometimes used for shorthand.

Greek writer Aeneas Tacticus also devised a method of steganography now known as the pinhole cipher. He tells of a method where you are to write a letter and mark specific characters inside the letter with a dot-shaped hole. The recipient of said letter will simply note down all letters below the holes and string them together to form a message. He also suggested writing down a message and whitening it, making it invisible, so that when soaked in water the message would be revealed. He suggests many other hiding methods, such as hiding a message in leaves, in the foot of a messenger's sandal, and even in animal bladders.

In his Compendium of Mechanics, Philo of Byzantium describes a recipe for invisible ink. He says to write down a message with crushed gallnuts dissolved in water. Then it could be revealed by being soaked by a sponge of ferrous sulfate. This recipe was inspired by the recipe for gall ink. Ferrous sulfate and crushed gallnuts dissolved in water both react to make ink so when they combine the message is revealed.

In his Ars Amatoria, Roman poet Ovid noted of a primitive form of invisible ink using milk to be used in writing love letters. Naturalist Pliny the Elder also wrote of the tithymalus plant in his Natural History, and how its milk could be used for invisible ink.

The first recorded use of the term steganography was by Johannnes Trithemius with his Steganographia, a book seemingly about summoning angels to hide messages. In reality however, the book was about steganography, the angel summoning being a cover text. Every angel corresponded to a different method of steganography.

He had written a letter to Arnold Bostius about his book, how it contained many methods of secret writing, how it could be used to communicate without speaking, signing or even nodding and much more. Bostius had died before he could receive the letter, however his colleagues had read and published it, accusing him of conversing with demons. Trithemius had also invited Charles de Bovelles to read his book before de Bovelles threw it away, claiming Trithemius was a magician. This situation led Trithemius to quit the book, not however, his interest in steganography.

In his work Polygraphiae, Trithemius developed his Ave Maria cipher, a polyalphabetic substitution cipher and form of steganography that can hide information in a Latin praise of God. It consists of around 384 alphabets of 24 letters corresponding to 24 words to praise God. To encode a message, take the first letter of your message and replace that letter with the corresponding word in the first alphabet. Do that for the second, the third, and so on. "Conservator magnus conservans cuncta iuftis fuis in felicitatibus amen", for example, contains the concealed word SECRET.

In the year 1606, Book I and II of the Steganographia were printed in Frankfurt, along with an incomplete Book III, and the Clavis Steganographie. The Clavis explained how to extract the secret of the Steganographia from Book I and II. Simply select an incantation to summon an "angel" and extract every other letter of every other word to find the secret steganographic method associated with that angel. With this publication came a slew of books vindicating Trithemius by explaining the steganography, acquitting him of magic. However, Book III was still widely regarded as a work of magic, with no clear way to extract its secrets. It would take until the late 1990s when Jim Reeds and Thomas Ernst independently discovered that it too, was secretly a work of steganography.

== Techniques ==
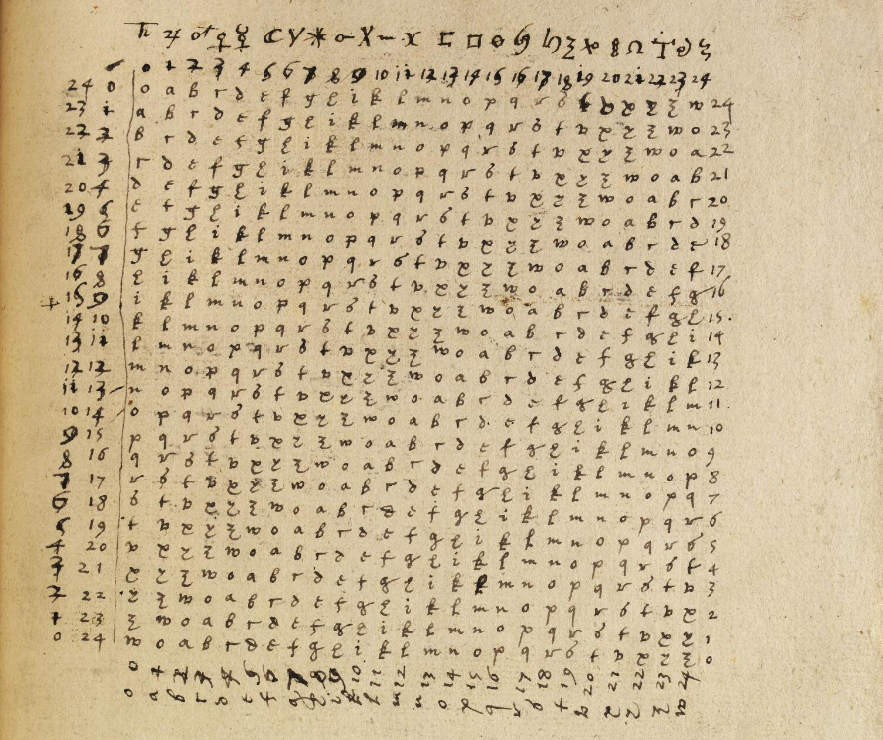
A code chart from a transcription of Steganographia

Numerous techniques throughout history have been developed to embed a message within another medium.

=== Physical ===
Placing the message in a physical item has been widely used for centuries. Some notable examples include invisible ink on paper, writing a message in Morse code on yarn worn by a courier, microdots, or using a music cipher to hide messages as musical notes in sheet music.

==== Social steganography ====
In communities with social or government taboos or censorship, people use cultural steganography—hiding messages in idiom, pop culture references, and other messages they share publicly and assume are monitored. This relies on social context to make the underlying messages visible only to certain readers. Examples include:

- Hiding a message in the title and context of a shared video or image.
- Misspelling names or words that are popular in the media in a given week, to suggest an alternative meaning.
- Hiding a picture that can be traced by using Paint or any other drawing tool.

=== Digital messages ===
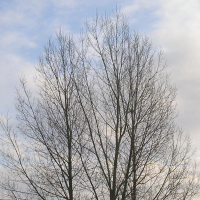
Image of a tree with a steganographically hidden image. The hidden image is revealed by removing all but the two least significant bits of each color component and a subsequent normalization. The hidden image is shown below.

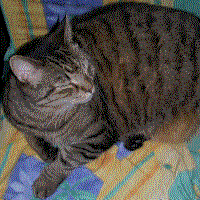
Image of a cat extracted from the tree image above

Since the dawn of computers, techniques have been developed to embed messages in digital cover mediums. The message to conceal is often encrypted, then used to overwrite part of a much larger block of encrypted data or a block of random data (an unbreakable cipher like the one-time pad generates ciphertexts that look perfectly random without the private key).

Examples of this include changing pixels in image or sound files, properties of digital text such as spacing and font choice, chaffing and winnowing, mimic functions, modifying the echo of a sound file (echo steganography), and including data in ignored sections of a file.

Images hidden in sound files

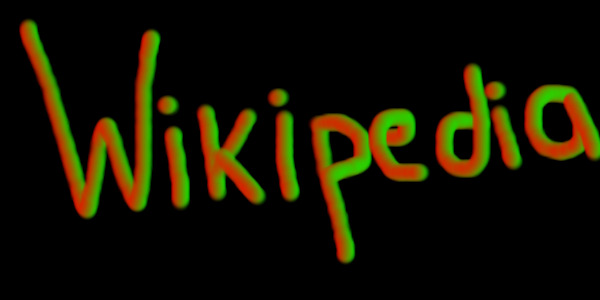
1. The word "Wikipedia" is drawn using computer software.

2. The image is converted into an audio file.

3. To decode the message, the audio is analysed through a spectrogram, revealing the initial image.

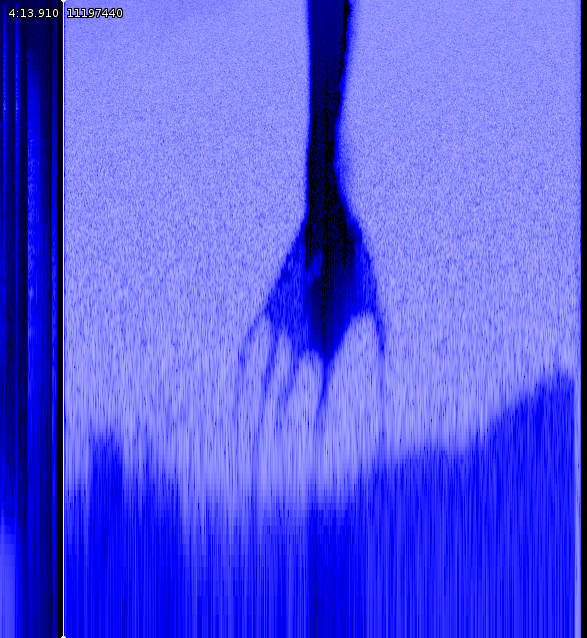
Spectrogram of a hidden image encoded as sound in the song "My Violent Heart" by Nine Inch Nails from the Year Zero album (2007)

=== Steganography in streaming media ===
Since the era of evolving network applications, steganography research has shifted from image steganography to steganography in streaming media such as Voice over Internet Protocol (VoIP).

In 2003, Giannoula et al. developed a data hiding technique leading to compressed forms of source video signals on a frame-by-frame basis.

In 2005, Dittmann et al. studied steganography and watermarking of multimedia contents such as VoIP.

In 2008, Yongfeng Huang and Shanyu Tang presented a novel approach to information hiding in low bit-rate VoIP speech stream, and their published work on steganography is the first-ever effort to improve the codebook partition by using Graph theory along with Quantization Index Modulation in low bit-rate streaming media.

In 2011 and 2012, Yongfeng Huang and Shanyu Tang devised new steganographic algorithms that use codec parameters as cover object to realise real-time covert VoIP steganography. Their findings were published in IEEE Transactions on Information Forensics and Security.

In 2024, Cheddad & Cheddad proposed a new framework for reconstructing lost or corrupted audio signals using a combination of machine learning techniques and latent information. The main idea of their paper is to enhance audio signal reconstruction by fusing steganography, halftoning (dithering), and state-of-the-art shallow and deep learning methods (e.g., RF, LSTM). This combination of steganography, halftoning, and machine learning for audio signal reconstruction may inspire further research in optimizing this approach or applying it to other domains, such as image reconstruction (i.e., inpainting).

=== Adaptive steganography ===
Adaptive steganography is a technique for concealing information within digital media by tailoring the embedding process to the specific features of the cover medium. An example of this approach is demonstrated in the work. Their method develops a skin tone detection algorithm, capable of identifying facial features, which is then applied to adaptive steganography. By incorporating face rotation into their approach, the technique aims to enhance its adaptivity to conceal information in a manner that is both less detectable and more robust across various facial orientations within images. This strategy can potentially improve the efficacy of information hiding in both static images and video content.

=== Cyber-physical systems/Internet of Things ===
Academic work since 2012 demonstrated the feasibility of steganography for cyber-physical systems (CPS)/the Internet of Things (IoT). Some techniques of CPS/IoT steganography overlap with network steganography, i.e. hiding data in communication protocols used in CPS/the IoT. However, specific techniques hide data in CPS components. For instance, data can be stored in unused registers of IoT/CPS components and in the states of IoT/CPS actuators.

=== Printed ===
Digital steganography output may be in the form of printed documents. A message, the plaintext, may be first encrypted by traditional means, producing a ciphertext. Then, an innocuous cover text is modified in some way so as to contain the ciphertext, resulting in the stegotext. For example, the letter size, spacing, typeface, or other characteristics of a cover text can be manipulated to carry the hidden message. Only a recipient who knows the technique used can recover the message and then decrypt it. Francis Bacon developed Bacon's cipher as such a technique.

The ciphertext produced by most digital steganography methods, however, is not printable. Traditional digital methods rely on perturbing noise in the channel file to hide the message, and as such, the channel file must be transmitted to the recipient with no additional noise from the transmission. Printing introduces much noise in the ciphertext, generally rendering the message unrecoverable. There are techniques that address this limitation, one notable example being ASCII Art Steganography.

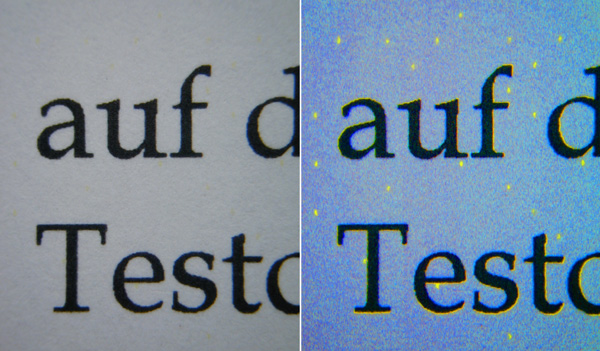
Yellow dots from a laser printer

Although not classic steganography, some types of modern color laser printers integrate the model, serial number, and timestamps on each printout for traceability reasons using a dot-matrix code made of small, yellow dots not recognizable to the naked eye.

=== Network ===
In 2015, a taxonomy of 109 network hiding methods was presented by Steffen Wendzel, Sebastian Zander et al. that summarized core concepts used in network steganography research. The taxonomy was developed further in recent years by several publications and authors and adjusted to new domains, such as CPS steganography.

In 1977, Kent concisely described the potential for covert channel signaling in general network communication protocols, even if the traffic is encrypted (in a footnote) in "Encryption-Based Protection for Interactive User/Computer Communication," Proceedings of the Fifth Data Communications Symposium, September 1977.

In 1987, Girling first studied covert channels on a local area network (LAN), identified and realised three obvious covert channels (two storage channels and one timing channel), and his research paper entitled “Covert channels in LAN’s” published in IEEE Transactions on Software Engineering, vol. SE-13 of 2, in February 1987.

In 1989, Wolf implemented covert channels in LAN protocols, e.g. using the reserved fields, pad fields, and undefined fields in the TCP/IP protocol.

In 1997, Rowland used the IP identification field, the TCP initial sequence number and acknowledge sequence number fields in TCP/IP headers to build covert channels.

In 2002, Kamran Ahsan made an excellent summary of research on network steganography.

In 2005, Steven J. Murdoch and Stephen Lewis contributed a chapter entitled "Embedding Covert Channels into TCP/IP" in the "Information Hiding" book published by Springer.

All information hiding techniques that may be used to exchange steganograms in telecommunication networks can be classified under the general term of network steganography. This nomenclature was originally introduced by Krzysztof Szczypiorski in 2003. Contrary to typical steganographic methods that use digital media (images, audio and video files) to hide data, network steganography uses communication protocols' control elements and their intrinsic functionality. As a result, such methods can be harder to detect and eliminate.

Typical network steganography methods involve modification of the properties of a single network protocol. Such modification can be applied to the protocol data unit (PDU), to the time relations between the exchanged PDUs, or both (hybrid methods).

Moreover, it is feasible to utilize the relation between two or more different network protocols to enable secret communication. These applications fall under the term inter-protocol steganography. Alternatively, multiple network protocols can be used simultaneously to transfer hidden information and so-called control protocols can be embedded into steganographic communications to extend their capabilities, e.g. to allow dynamic overlay routing or the switching of utilized hiding methods and network protocols.

Network steganography covers a broad spectrum of techniques, which include, among others:

- Steganophony – the concealment of messages in Voice-over-IP conversations, e.g. the employment of delayed or corrupted packets that would normally be ignored by the receiver (this method is called LACK – Lost Audio Packets Steganography), or, alternatively, hiding information in unused header fields.
- WLAN Steganography – transmission of steganograms in Wireless Local Area Networks. A practical example of WLAN Steganography is the HICCUPS system (Hidden Communication System for Corrupted Networks)

== Additional terminology ==
Discussions of steganography generally use terminology analogous to and consistent with conventional radio and communications technology. However, some terms appear specifically in software and are easily confused. These are the most relevant ones to digital steganographic systems:

The payload is the data covertly communicated. The carrier is the signal, stream, or data file that hides the payload, which differs from the channel, which typically means the type of input, such as a JPEG image. The resulting signal, stream, or data file with the encoded payload is sometimes called the package, stego file, or covert message. The proportion of bytes, samples, or other signal elements modified to encode the payload is called the encoding density and is typically expressed as a number between 0 and 1.

In a set of files, the files that are considered likely to contain a payload are suspects. A suspect identified through some type of statistical analysis can be referred to as a candidate.

== Countermeasures and detection ==
Detecting physical steganography requires a careful physical examination, including the use of magnification, developer chemicals, and ultraviolet light. It is a time-consuming process with obvious resource implications, even in countries that employ many people to spy on other citizens. However, it is feasible to screen mail of certain suspected individuals or institutions, such as prisons or prisoner-of-war (POW) camps.

During World War II, prisoner of war camps gave prisoners specially treated paper that would reveal invisible ink. An article in the 24 June 1948 issue of Paper Trade Journal by the Technical Director of the United States Government Printing Office had Morris S. Kantrowitz describe in general terms the development of this paper. Three prototype papers (Sensicoat, Anilith, and Coatalith) were used to manufacture postcards and stationery provided to German prisoners of war in the US and Canada. If POWs tried to write a hidden message, the special paper rendered it visible. The US granted at least two patents related to the technology, one to Kantrowitz, U.S. patent 2,515,232, "Water-Detecting paper and Water-Detecting Coating Composition Therefor," patented 18 July 1950, and an earlier one, "Moisture-Sensitive Paper and the Manufacture Thereof," U.S. patent 2,445,586, patented 20 July 1948. A similar strategy issues prisoners with writing paper ruled with a water-soluble ink that runs in contact with water-based invisible ink.

In computing, steganographically encoded package detection is called steganalysis. The simplest method to detect modified files, however, is to compare them to known originals. For example, to detect information being moved through the graphics on a website, an analyst can maintain known clean copies of the materials and then compare them against the current contents of the site. The differences, if the carrier is the same, comprise the payload. In general, using extremely high compression rates makes steganography difficult but not impossible. Compression errors provide a hiding place for data, but high compression reduces the amount of data available to hold the payload, raising the encoding density, which facilitates easier detection (in extreme cases, even by casual observation).

There are a variety of basic tests that can be done to identify whether or not a secret message exists. This process is not concerned with the extraction of the message, which is a different process and a separate step. The most basic approaches of steganalysis are visual or aural attacks, structural attacks, and statistical attacks. These approaches attempt to detect the steganographic algorithms that were used. These algorithms range from unsophisticated to very sophisticated, with early algorithms being much easier to detect due to statistical anomalies that were present. The size of the message that is being hidden is a factor in how difficult it is to detect. The overall size of the cover object also plays a factor as well. If the cover object is small and the message is large, this can distort the statistics and make it easier to detect. A larger cover object with a small message decreases the statistics and gives it a better chance of going unnoticed.

Steganalysis that targets a particular algorithm has much better success as it is able to key in on the anomalies that are left behind. This is because the analysis can perform a targeted search to discover known tendencies since it is aware of the behaviors that it commonly exhibits. When analyzing an image the least significant bits of many images are actually not random. The camera sensor, especially lower-end sensors are not the best quality and can introduce some random bits. This can also be affected by the file compression done on the image. Secret messages can be introduced into the least significant bits in an image and then hidden. A steganography tool can be used to camouflage the secret message in the least significant bits but it can introduce a random area that is too perfect. This area of perfect randomization stands out and can be detected by comparing the least significant bits to the next-to-least significant bits on an image that hasn't been compressed.

Generally, though, there are many techniques known to be able to hide messages in data using steganographic techniques. None are, by definition, obvious when users employ standard applications, but some can be detected by specialist tools. Others, however, are resistant to detection—or rather it is not possible to reliably distinguish data containing a hidden message from data containing just noise—even when the most sophisticated analysis is performed. Steganography is being used to conceal and deliver more effective cyber attacks, referred to as Stegware. The term Stegware was first introduced in 2017 to describe any malicious operation involving steganography as a vehicle to conceal an attack. Detection of steganography is challenging, and because of that, not an adequate defence. Therefore, the only way of defeating the threat is to transform data in a way that destroys any hidden messages, a process called Content Threat Removal.

== Applications ==
=== Use in modern printers ===
Some modern computer printers use steganography, including Hewlett-Packard and Xerox brand color laser printers. The printers add tiny yellow dots to each page. The barely visible dots contain encoded printer serial numbers and date and time stamps.

The Electronic Frontier Foundation confirmed the marks are a forensic tracking tool, reportedly part of a secret agreement between printer manufacturers and governments to help track counterfeiters.

=== Example from modern practice ===
The larger the cover message (in binary data, the number of bits) relative to the hidden message, the easier it is to hide the hidden message (as an analogy, the larger the "haystack", the easier it is to hide a "needle"). So digital pictures, which contain much data, are sometimes used to hide messages on the Internet and on other digital communication media. It is not clear how common this practice actually is.

For example, a 24-bit bitmap uses eight bits to represent each of the three color values (red, green, and blue) of each pixel. The blue alone has 2^{8} different levels of blue intensity. The difference between 11111111_{2} and 11111110_{2} in the value for blue intensity is likely to be undetectable by the human eye. Therefore, the least significant bit can be used more or less undetectably for something else other than color information. If that is repeated for the green and the red elements of each pixel as well, it is possible to encode one letter of ASCII text for every three pixels.

Stated somewhat more formally, the objective for making steganographic encoding difficult to detect is to ensure that the changes to the original signal (the 'carrier') caused by the injection of the signal to be covertly embedded (the 'payload') are visually and also statistically (ideally) negligible. The changes are indistinguishable from the noise floor of the carrier. All media can be a carrier, but media with a large amount of redundant or compressible information is better suited.

From an information theoretical point of view, that means that the channel must have more capacity than the "surface" signal requires. There must be redundancy. For a digital image, it may be noise from the imaging element; for digital audio, it may be noise from recording techniques or amplification equipment. In general, electronics that digitize an analog signal suffer from several noise sources, such as thermal noise, flicker noise, and shot noise. The noise provides enough variation in the captured digital information that it can be exploited as a noise cover for hidden data. In addition, lossy compression schemes (such as JPEG) always introduce some error to the decompressed data, and it is possible to exploit that for steganographic use, as well.

Although steganography and digital watermarking seem similar, they are not. In steganography, the hidden message should remain intact until it reaches its destination. Steganography can be used for digital watermarking in which a message (being simply an identifier) is hidden in an image so that its source can be tracked or verified (for example, Coded Anti-Piracy) or even just to identify an image (as in the EURion constellation). In such a case, the technique of hiding the message (here, the watermark) must be robust to prevent tampering. However, digital watermarking sometimes requires a brittle watermark, which can be modified easily, to check whether the image has been tampered with. That is the key difference between steganography and digital watermarking.

=== Alleged use by intelligence services ===
In 2010, the Federal Bureau of Investigation alleged that the Russian foreign intelligence service uses customized steganography software for embedding encrypted text messages inside image files for certain communications with "illegal agents" (agents without diplomatic cover) stationed abroad.

On 23 April 2019 the U.S. Department of Justice unsealed an indictment charging Xiaoqing Zheng, a Chinese businessman and former Principal Engineer at General Electric, with 14 counts of conspiring to steal intellectual property and trade secrets from General Electric. Zheng had allegedly used steganography to exfiltrate 20,000 documents from General Electric to Tianyi Aviation Technology Co. in Nanjing, China, a company the FBI accused him of starting with backing from the Chinese government.

=== Distributed steganography ===
There are distributed steganography methods, including methodologies that distribute the payload through multiple carrier files in diverse locations to make detection more difficult. For example, U.S. patent 8,527,779 by cryptographer William Easttom (Chuck Easttom).

=== Online challenge ===
The puzzles that are presented by Cicada 3301 incorporate steganography with cryptography and other solving techniques since 2012. Puzzles involving steganography have also been featured in other alternative reality games.

The communications of The May Day mystery incorporate steganography and other solving techniques since 1981.

=== Computer malware ===
It is possible to steganographically hide computer malware into digital images, videos, audio and various other files in order to evade detection by antivirus software. This type of malware is called stegomalware. It can be activated by external code, which can be malicious or even non-malicious if some vulnerability in the software reading the file is exploited.

Stegomalware can be removed from certain files without knowing whether they contain stegomalware or not. This is done through content disarm and reconstruction (CDR) software, and it involves reprocessing the entire file or removing parts from it. Various methods can be employed within CDR software to counter stegomalware with varying levels of mitigation relative to visual integrity disruption. Actually detecting stegomalware in a file can be difficult and may involve testing the file behaviour in virtual environments or deep learning analysis of the file.

== Steganalysis ==
=== Stegoanalytical algorithms ===
Stegoanalytical algorithms can be cataloged in different ways, highlighting: according to the available information and according to the purpose sought.

==== According to the information available ====
There is the possibility of cataloging these algorithms based on the information held by the stegoanalyst in terms of clear and encrypted messages. It is a technique similar to cryptography, however, they have several differences:

- Chosen stego attack: the stegoanalyst perceives the final target stego and the steganographic algorithm used.
- Known cover attack: the stegoanalyst comprises the initial conductive target and the final target stego.
- Known stego attack: the stegoanalyst knows the initial carrier target and the final target stego, in addition to the algorithm used.
- Stego only attack: the stegoanalyst perceives exclusively the stego target.
- Chosen message attack: the stegoanalyst, following a message selected by him, originates a stego target.
- Known message attack: the stegoanalyst owns the stego target and the hidden message, which is known to them.

==== According to the purpose sought ====
The principal purpose of steganography is to transfer information unnoticed, however, it is possible for an attacker to have two different pretensions:

- Passive steganalysis: does not alter the target stego, therefore, it examines the target stego in order to establish whether it carries hidden information and recovers the hidden message, the key used or both.
- Active steganalysis: changes the initial stego target, therefore, it seeks to suppress the transfer of information, if it exists.

== See also ==
- 40-track mode – Method for hiding data on a floppy disk
- Acrostic – Text formed from parts of another text
- The Adventure of the Dancing Men – 1905 short story by Arthur Conan Doyle
- Audio watermark – Electronic identifier embedded in an audio signal
- Bible code – Purported set of secret messages encoded within the Hebrew text of the Torah
- BPCS-Steganography – Computer message obfuscation technology
- Camera/Shy – Hacktivist group
- Canary trap – Method for exposing an information leak
- Covert channel – Computer security attack
- Cryptography – Practice and study of secure communication techniques
- Deniable encryption – Encryption where existence of a plaintext is difficult to proof
- Digital watermarking – Marker covertly embedded in a signal
- Invisible ink – Substance used for writing which is invisible and can later be made visible
- Musical Steganography – Hiding a message using musical notation
- Polybius square – Type of code
- Security engineering – Process of incorporating security controls into an information system
- Security printing – Field of the printing industry for banknotes and other security products
- Semiotics – Study of signs
- Steganographic file system
- Steganography tools – Software for embedding hidden data inside a carrier file
- Visual cryptography – Cryptographic technique
- Warrant canary – Method of indirect notification of a subpoena

== Sources ==
- Wayner, Peter (2002). Disappearing cryptography: information hiding: steganography & watermarking. Amsterdam: MK/Morgan Kaufmann Publishers. ISBN 978-1-558-60769-9. Archived from the original on 24 December 2010.
- Wayner, Peter (2009). Disappearing cryptography 3rd Edition: information hiding: steganography & watermarking. Amsterdam: MK/Morgan Kaufmann Publishers. ISBN 978-0-123-74479-1. Archived from the original on 24 December 2010.
- Petitcolas, Fabien A.P.; Katzenbeisser, Stefan (2000). Information Hiding Techniques for Steganography and Digital Watermarking. Artech House Publishers. ISBN 978-1-580-53035-4.
- Johnson, Neil; Duric, Zoran; Jajodia, Sushil (2001). Information hiding: steganography and watermarking: attacks and countermeasures. Springer. ISBN 978-0-792-37204-2.
- Petitcolas, Fabien A.P.; Katzenbeisser, Stefan (2016). Information Hiding. Artech House Publishers. ISBN 978-1608079285.
