= Timeline of cryptography =

Below is a timeline of notable events related to cryptography.

== B.C.E. ==
- 600-500 – Hebrew scholars make use of simple monoalphabetic substitution ciphers (such as the Atbash cipher)
- c. 400 – Spartan use of scytale (alleged)
- c. 400 – Herodotus reports use of steganography in reports to Greece from Persia (tattoo on shaved head)
- 100-1 C.E.- Notable Roman ciphers such as the Caesar cipher.

== 1–1799 C.E. ==
- 801–873 C.E. – Cryptanalysis and frequency analysis leading to techniques for breaking monoalphabetic substitution ciphers are developed in A Manuscript on Deciphering Cryptographic Messages by the Muslim mathematician, Al-Kindi (Alkindus), who may have been inspired by textual analysis of the Qur'an. He also covers methods of encipherments, cryptanalysis of certain encipherments, and statistical analysis of letters and letter combinations in Arabic.
- 1450 – The Chinese develop wooden block movable type printing.
- 1450–1520 – The Voynich manuscript, an example of a possibly encoded illustrated book, is written.
- 1466 – Leon Battista Alberti invents polyalphabetic cipher, also first known mechanical cipher machine
- 1518 – Johannes Trithemius' book on cryptology
- 1553 – Bellaso invents Vigenère cipher
- 1585 – Vigenère's book on ciphers
- 1586 – Cryptanalysis used by spymaster Sir Francis Walsingham to implicate Mary, Queen of Scots, in the Babington Plot to murder Elizabeth I of England. Queen Mary was eventually executed.
- 1641 – Wilkins' Mercury (English book on cryptology)
- 1793 – Claude Chappe establishes the first long-distance semaphore telegraph line
- 1795 – Thomas Jefferson invents the Jefferson disk cipher, reinvented over 100 years later by Etienne Bazeries

== 1800–1899 ==
- 1809–14 George Scovell's work on Napoleonic ciphers during the Peninsular War
- 1831 – Joseph Henry proposes and builds an electric telegraph
- 1835 – Samuel Morse develops the Morse code
- 1854 – Charles Wheatstone invents the Playfair cipher
- c. 1854 – Babbage's method for breaking polyalphabetic ciphers (pub 1863 by Kasiski)
- 1855 – For the English side in Crimean War, Charles Babbage broke Vigenère's autokey cipher (the 'unbreakable cipher' of the time) as well as the much weaker cipher that is called Vigenère cipher today. Due to secrecy it was also discovered and attributed somewhat later to the Prussian Friedrich Kasiski.
- 1883 – Auguste Kerckhoffs' La Cryptographie militare published, containing his celebrated laws of cryptography
- 1885 – Beale ciphers published
- 1894 – The Dreyfus Affair in France involves the use of cryptography, and its misuse, in regard to false documents.

== 1900–1949 ==
- 1916-1922 – William Friedman and Elizebeth Smith Friedman apply statistics to cryptanalysis (coincidence counting, etc.), write Riverbank Publications
- 1917 – Gilbert Vernam develops first practical implementation of a teletype cipher, now known as a stream cipher and, later, with Joseph Mauborgne the one-time pad
- 1917 – Zimmermann telegram intercepted and decrypted, advancing U.S. entry into World War I
- 1919 – Weimar Germany Foreign Office adopts (a manual) one-time pad for some traffic
- 1919 – Edward Hebern invents/patents first rotor machine design—Damm, Scherbius and Koch follow with patents the same year
- 1921 – Washington Naval Conference – U.S. negotiating team aided by decryption of Japanese diplomatic telegrams
- c. 1924 – MI8 (Herbert Yardley, et al.) provide breaks of assorted traffic in support of US position at Washington Naval Conference
- c. 1932 – first break of German Army Enigma by Marian Rejewski in Poland
- 1929 – United States Secretary of State Henry L. Stimson shuts down State Department cryptanalysis "Black Chamber", saying "Gentlemen do not read each other's mail."
- 1931 – The American Black Chamber by Herbert O. Yardley is published, revealing much about American cryptography
- 1940 – Break of Japan's PURPLE machine cipher by SIS team
- December 7, 1941 – attack on Pearl Harbor; U.S. Navy base at Pearl Harbor in Oahu is surprised by Japanese attack, despite U.S. breaking of Japanese codes. U.S. enters World War II.
- June 1942 – Battle of Midway where U.S. partial break into Dec 41 edition of JN-25 leads to turning-point victory over Japan
- April 1943 – Admiral Yamamoto, architect of Pearl Harbor attack, is assassinated by U.S. forces who know his itinerary from decoded messages
- April 1943 – Max Newman, Wynn-Williams, and their team (including Alan Turing) at the secret Government Code and Cypher School ('Station X'), Bletchley Park, Bletchley, England, complete the "Heath Robinson". This is a specialized machine for cipher-breaking, not a general-purpose calculator or computer.
- December 1943 – The Colossus computer was built, by Thomas Flowers at The Post Office Research Laboratories in London, to crack the German Lorenz cipher (SZ42). Colossus was used at Bletchley Park during World War II – as a successor to April's 'Robinson's. Although 10 were eventually built, unfortunately they were destroyed immediately after they had finished their work – it was so advanced that there was to be no possibility of its design falling into the wrong hands.
- 1944 – Patent application filed on SIGABA code machine used by U.S. in World War II. Kept secret, it finally issues in 2001
- 1946 – The Venona project's first break into Soviet espionage traffic from the early 1940s
- 1948 – Claude Shannon writes a paper that establishes the mathematical basis of information theory.
- 1949 – Shannon's Communication Theory of Secrecy Systems published in Bell Labs Technical Journal

== 1950–1999 ==
- 1951 – U.S. National Security Agency founded. KL-7 rotor machine introduced sometime thereafter.
- 1957 – First production order for KW-26 electronic encryption system.
- August 1964 – Gulf of Tonkin Incident leads U.S. into Vietnam War, possibly due to misinterpretation of signals intelligence by NSA.
- 1967 – David Kahn's The Codebreakers is published.
- 1968 – John Anthony Walker walks into the Soviet Union's embassy in Washington and sells information on KL-7 cipher machine. The Walker spy ring operates until 1985.
- 1969 – The first hosts of ARPANET, Internet's ancestor, are connected.
- 1970 – Using quantum states to encode information is first proposed: Stephen Wiesner invents conjugate coding and applies it to design “money physically impossible to counterfeit” (still technologically unfeasible today).
- 1974? – Horst Feistel develops Feistel network block cipher design.
- 1976 – The Data Encryption Standard published as an official Federal Information Processing Standard (FIPS) for the United States.
- 1976 – Diffie and Hellman publish New Directions in Cryptography.
- 1977 – RSA public key encryption invented.
- 1978 – Robert McEliece invents the McEliece cryptosystem, the first asymmetric encryption algorithm to use randomization in the encryption process.
- 1981 – Richard Feynman proposed quantum computers. The main application he had in mind was the simulation of quantum systems, but he also mentioned the possibility of solving other problems.
- 1984 – Based on Stephen Wiesner's idea from the 1970s, Charles Bennett and Gilles Brassard design the first quantum cryptography protocol, BB84.
- 1985 – Walker spy ring uncovered. Remaining KL-7's withdrawn from service.
- 1986 – After an increasing number of break-ins to government and corporate computers, United States Congress passes the Computer Fraud and Abuse Act, which makes it a crime to break into computer systems. The law, however, does not cover juveniles.
- 1988 – African National Congress uses computer-based one-time pads to build a network inside South Africa.
- 1989 – Tim Berners-Lee and Robert Cailliau built the prototype system which became the World Wide Web at CERN.
- 1989 – Quantum cryptography experimentally demonstrated in a proof-of-the-principle experiment by Charles Bennett et al.
- 1991 – Phil Zimmermann releases the public key encryption program PGP along with its source code, which quickly appears on the Internet.
- 1994 – Bruce Schneier's Applied Cryptography is published.
- 1994 – Secure Sockets Layer (SSL) encryption protocol released by Netscape.
- 1994 – Peter Shor devises an algorithm which lets quantum computers determine the factorization of large integers quickly. This is the first interesting problem for which quantum computers promise a significant speed-up, and it therefore generates a lot of interest in quantum computers.
- 1994 – DNA computing proof of concept on toy travelling salesman problem; a method for input/output still to be determined.
- 1994 – Russian crackers siphon $10 million from Citibank and transfer the money to bank accounts around the world. Vladimir Levin, the 30-year-old ringleader, uses his work laptop after hours to transfer the funds to accounts in Finland and Israel. Levin stands trial in the United States and is sentenced to three years in prison. Authorities recover all but $400,000 of the stolen money.
- 1994 – Formerly proprietary, but un-patented, RC4 cipher algorithm is published on the Internet.
- 1994 – First RSA Factoring Challenge from 1977 is decrypted as The Magic Words are Squeamish Ossifrage.
- 1995 – NSA publishes the SHA1 hash algorithm as part of its Digital Signature Standard.
- July 1997 – OpenPGP specification (RFC 2440) released
- 1997 – Ciphersaber, an encryption system based on RC4 that is simple enough to be reconstructed from memory, is published on Usenet.
- October 1998 – Digital Millennium Copyright Act (DMCA) becomes law in U.S., criminalizing production and dissemination of technology that can circumvent technical measures taken to protect copyright.
- October 1999 – DeCSS, a computer program capable of decrypting content on a DVD, is published on the Internet.

== 2000 and beyond ==
- January 14, 2000 – U.S. Government announce restrictions on export of cryptography are relaxed (although not removed). This allows many US companies to stop the long running process of having to create US and international copies of their software.
- March 2000 – President of the United States Bill Clinton says he doesn't use e-mail to communicate with his daughter, Chelsea Clinton, at college because he doesn't think the medium is secure.
- September 6, 2000 – RSA Security Inc. released their RSA algorithm into the public domain, a few days in advance of their U.S. patent 4,405,829 expiring. Following the relaxation of the U.S. government export restrictions, this removed one of the last barriers to the worldwide distribution of much software based on cryptographic systems
- 2000 – UK Regulation of Investigatory Powers Act requires anyone to supply their cryptographic key to a duly authorized person on request
- 2001 – Belgian Rijndael algorithm selected as the U.S. Advanced Encryption Standard (AES) after a five-year public search process by National Institute of Standards and Technology (NIST)
- 2001 – Scott Fluhrer, Itsik Mantin and Adi Shamir publish an attack on WiFi's Wired Equivalent Privacy security layer
- September 11, 2001 – U.S. response to terrorist attacks hampered by lack of secure communications
- November 2001 – Microsoft and its allies vow to end "full disclosure" of security vulnerabilities by replacing it with "responsible" disclosure guidelines
- 2002 – NESSIE project releases final report / selections
- August 2002, PGP Corporation formed, purchasing assets from NAI.
- 2003 – CRYPTREC project releases 2003 report / recommendations
- 2004 – The hash MD5 is shown to be vulnerable to practical collision attack
- 2004 – The first commercial quantum cryptography system becomes available from id Quantique.
- 2005 – Potential for attacks on SHA1 demonstrated
- 2005 – Agents from the U.S. FBI demonstrate their ability to crack WEP using publicly available tools
- May 1, 2007 – Users swamp Digg.com with copies of a 128-bit key to the AACS system used to protect HD DVD and Blu-ray video discs. The user revolt was a response to Digg's decision, subsequently reversed, to remove the keys, per demands from the motion picture industry that cited the U.S. DMCA anti-circumvention provisions.
- November 2, 2007 – NIST hash function competition announced.
- 2009 – Bitcoin network was launched.
- 2010 – The master key for High-bandwidth Digital Content Protection (HDCP) and the private signing key for the Sony PlayStation 3 game console are recovered and published using separate cryptoanalytic attacks. PGP Corp. is acquired by Symantec.
- 2012 – NIST selects the Keccak algorithm as the winner of its SHA-3 hash function competition.
- 2013 – Edward Snowden discloses a vast trove of classified documents from NSA. See Global surveillance disclosures (2013–present)
- 2013 – Dual_EC_DRBG is discovered to have a NSA backdoor.
- 2013 – NSA publishes Simon and Speck lightweight block ciphers.
- 2014 – The Password Hashing Competition accepts 24 entries.
- 2015 – Year by which NIST suggests that 80-bit keys be phased out.
- 2024 – August 13th 2024 - NIST releases first 3 finalized post-quantum encryption standards.

== See also ==
- History of cryptography
