= Scytale (disambiguation) =

Scytale may refer to:

- Scytale, an encryption tool used to perform a transposition cipher.
- Scytale (Dune), a fictional character in the Dune universe created by Frank Herbert.
- A taxonomic synonym for Agkistrodon, a genus of venomous pitvipers found in North America from the United States as far south as northern Costa Rica.
