= Classical cryptography =

Classical cryptography may refer to:

- Classical ciphers, a type of cipher that was used historically but is easy to break with modern computers
- Cryptography that is not quantum-proof
