= ROT13 =

Simple encryption method

ROT13 is a simple letter substitution cipher that replaces a letter with the 13th letter after it in the Latin alphabet. It is a special case of the Caesar cipher which was developed in ancient Rome, and used by Julius Caesar in the 1st century BC (see timeline of cryptography).

ROT13 may be referred to as Rotate13, ROT-13, rotate by 13 places, or sometimes by its autonym EBG13.

== Description ==
Applying ROT13 to a piece of text requires examining its alphabetic characters and replacing each one by the letter 13 places further along in the Latin alphabet, wrapping back to the beginning as necessary.

When encoding a message, A becomes N, B becomes O, and so on up to M, which becomes Z. Then the sequence continues at the beginning of the alphabet: N becomes A, O becomes B, and so on to Z, which becomes M. When decoding a message, the same substitution rules are applied, but this time on the ROT13 encrypted text. Other characters, such as numbers, symbols, punctuation or whitespace, are left unchanged.

Because there are 26 letters in the basic Latin alphabet and 26 = 2 × 13, the ROT13 function is its own inverse:

$\mbox{ROT}_{13}(\mbox{ROT}_{13}(x))=x$ for any basic Latin-alphabet text $x$.

In other words, two successive applications of ROT13 restore the original text (in mathematics, this is sometimes called an involution; in cryptography, a reciprocal cipher).

The transformation can be done using a lookup table, such as the following:

Input	ABCDEFGHIJKLMNOPQRSTUVWXYZabcdefghijklmnopqrstuvwxyz
Output	NOPQRSTUVWXYZABCDEFGHIJKLMnopqrstuvwxyzabcdefghijklm

For example, in the following joke, the punchline has been obscured by ROT13:

Why did the chicken cross the road?
Gb trg gb gur bgure fvqr!

Transforming the entire text via ROT13 form, the answer to the joke is revealed:

Jul qvq gur puvpxra pebff gur ebnq?
To get to the other side!

A second application of ROT13 would restore the original.

== Usage ==
ROT13 is not intended to be used where secrecy is of any concern—the use of a constant shift means that the encryption effectively has no key, and decryption requires no more knowledge than the fact that ROT13 is in use. Even without this knowledge, the algorithm is easily broken through frequency analysis.

In the early 1980s, people used ROT13 in their messages on Usenet newsgroup servers. They did this to hide potentially offensive jokes, or to obscure an answer to a puzzle or other spoiler, or to fool less sophisticated spambots. ROT13 has been the subject of many jokes.

The 1989 International Obfuscated C Code Contest (IOCCC) included an entry by Brian Westley. Westley's computer program can be encoded in ROT13 or reversed and still compiles correctly. Its operation when executed is either to perform ROT13 encoding on, or to reverse, its input.

In December 1999, it was found that Netscape Communicator used ROT13 as part of an insecure scheme to store email passwords.

In 2001, Russian programmer Dimitry Sklyarov demonstrated that an eBook vendor, New Paradigm Research Group (NPRG), used ROT13 to encrypt their documents. It has been speculated that NPRG may have mistaken the ROT13 toy example—provided with the Adobe eBook software development kit—for a serious encryption scheme. Windows XP uses ROT13 on some of its registry keys. ROT13 is also used in the Unix fortune program to conceal potentially offensive quotations.

Johann Bessler, an 18th-century clockmaker and constructor of perpetual motion machines, pointed out that ROT13 encodes his surname as Orffyre. He used its latinised form, Orffyreus, as his pseudonym.

ROT13 is used in some online discussions that don't have spoiler functionality to avoid accidentally revealing secrets or plot points

== Net culture ==
Because of its utter unsuitability for real secrecy, ROT13 has become a catchphrase to refer to any conspicuously weak encryption scheme; a critic might claim that "56-bit DES is little better than ROT13 these days". In a play on real terms like double DES several terms cropped up with humorous intent:

- Double ROT13: applying ROT13 to an already ROT13-encrypted text results in the original plaintext.
- ROT26: equivalent to no encryption at all.
- 2ROT13 was included in a spoof academic paper entitled "On the 2ROT13 Encryption Algorithm".
- triple-ROT13: used jokingly in analogy with 3DES, it is equivalent to regular ROT13.

ROT13 jokes were popular on many newsgroup servers, like net.jokes as early as the 1980s.

The newsgroup alt.folklore.urban coined a word—furrfu—that was the ROT13 encoding of the frequent utterance sheesh. Furrfu evolved in mid-1992 as a response to postings repeating urban myths on alt.folklore.urban, after some posters complained that "sheesh!" as a response to newcomers was being overused.

== Word pairs ==
ROT13 reciprocal word pairs
abcdefghijklmnopqrstuvwxyz NOPQRSTUVWXYZABCDEFGHIJKLM
aha and nun	ant and nag
balk and onyx	bar and one
barf and ones	be and or
bin and ova	ebbs and roof
envy and rail	er and re
errs and reef	flap and sync
fur and she	gel and try
gnat and tang	irk and vex
clerk and pyrex	purely and cheryl
PNG and cat	SHA and fun
furby and sheol	terra and green
what and Jung	URL and hey
shone and FUBAR	Ares and Nerf

Some words will, when transformed with ROT13, produce another word. Examples of seven-letter pairs in the English language are abjurer and nowhere, and Chechen and purpura. Other examples of word pairs are shown in the table. The pair gnat and tang is an example of words that are both ROT13 reciprocals and reversals.

== Variants and combinations ==
ROT5 is a practice similar to ROT13 that applies to numeric digits (0 to 9). ROT13 and ROT5 can be used together in the same message, sometimes called ROT18 (18 = 13 + 5) or ROT13.5.

ROT47 is a derivative of ROT13 which, in addition to enciphering the Latin alphabet, transforms numbers and common symbols. Instead of using the sequence A–Z as the alphabet, ROT47 uses a larger set of characters from the common character encoding known as ASCII. Specifically, the 7-bit printable characters, excluding space, from character 33 (!) through 126 (~), 94 in total, in the order of their ASCII codes, are rotated by 47 positions, without considering letter case. For example, the character A is mapped to p, while a is mapped to 2.

The use of a larger alphabet produces a more thorough obfuscation than that of ROT13; for example, a telephone number such as +1-415-839-6885 is not obvious at first sight from the scrambled result Z`\c`d\gbh\eggd. On the other hand, because ROT47 introduces numbers and symbols into the mix without discrimination, it is more immediately obvious that the text has been encoded.

Example:

The Quick Brown Fox Jumps Over The Lazy Dog.

enciphers to

%96 "F:4< qC@H? u@I yF>AD ~G6C %96 {2KJ s@8]

The GNU C library, a set of standard routines available for use in computer programming, contains a function—memfrob()—which has a similar purpose to ROT13, although it is intended for use with arbitrary binary data. The function operates by combining each byte with the binary pattern 00101010 (decimal 42) using the exclusive or (XOR) operation. This effects a simple XOR cipher. Like ROT13, XOR (and therefore memfrob()) is self-reciprocal, and provides a similar, virtually absent, level of security.

== Implementation ==
=== tr ===
The ROT13 and ROT47 are fairly easy to implement using the Unix terminal application tr; to encrypt the string "Pack My Box With Five Dozen Liquor Jugs" in ROT13:

$ # Map upper case A-Z to N-ZA-M and lower case a-z to n-za-m
$ tr 'A-Za-z' 'N-ZA-Mn-za-m' <<< "Pack My Box With Five Dozen Liquor Jugs"
Cnpx Zl Obk Jvgu Svir Qbmra Yvdhbe Whtf

and the string "The Quick Brown Fox Jumps Over The Lazy Dog" in ROT47:

$ echo "The Quick Brown Fox Jumps Over The Lazy Dog" | tr '\!-~' 'P-~\!-O'
> %96 "F:4< qC@H? u@I yF>AD ~G6C %96 {2KJ s@8

=== Emacs and Vim ===
In Emacs, one can ROT13 the buffer or a selection with the commands: M-x toggle-rot13-mode, M-x rot13-other-window, or M-x rot13-region.

In the Vim text editor, one can ROT13 a buffer with the command: ggg?G.

=== JavaScript ===
Without using specific built-in cryptographic libraries or advanced string methods, a ROT13 function can be implemented manually in JavaScript by processing characters one by one and performing a direct letter lookup and shift:

function rot13(str) {
  const upper_case = "ABCDEFGHIJKLMNOPQRSTUVWXYZ".split("");
  const lower_case = "abcdefghijklmnopqrstuvwxyz".split("");

  let result = "";

  for (let i = 0; i < str.length; i++) {
    const char = str[i];

    if (upper_case.includes(char)) {
      let index = upper_case.indexOf(char);
      // Rotate the index by 13 positions.
      // If index is from 0 to 12  then add 13. If index is from 13 to 25, subtract 13
      let rotated_Index = index < 13 ? index + 13 : index - 13;
      result += upper_case[rotated_Index];
    }
    // Check if the character is a lowercase letter
    else if (lower_case.includes(char)) {
      let index = lower_case.indexOf(char);

      // Rotate the index by 13 positions.
      let rotated_Index = index < 13 ? index + 13 : index - 13;
      result += lower_case[rotated_Index];
    }

    // If it's not a letter, append it as it is
    else {
      result += char;
    }
  }

  return result;
}
// Example usage:
// console.log(rot13("Hello World!")); // Uryyb Jbeyq!
// console.log(rot13("Javascript is fun.")); // Wninfpevcg vf sha.

=== Python ===
The module codecs has a "rot13" text transform option:

>>> import codecs
>>> print(codecs.encode("The Quick Brown Fox Jumps Over The Lazy Dog", "rot13"))
Gur Dhvpx Oebja Sbk Whzcf Bire Gur Ynml Qbt

Without importing any libraries, the cipher can be done by creating a translation table manually: (Note: This source code is a slight variation of an example in Zen of Python)

>>> def gen_rot13_table(func=lambda x: x):
...     for c in (ord("A"), ord("a")):
...         for i in range(26):
...             yield func(i + c), func((i + 13) % 26 + c)
>>> table = dict(gen_rot13_table(chr))
>>> table
{'A': 'N', 'B': 'O', 'C': 'P', 'D': 'Q', 'E': 'R', 'F': 'S', 'G': 'T', 'H': 'U', 'I': 'V', 'J': 'W', 'K': 'X', 'L': 'Y', 'M': 'Z', 'N': 'A', 'O': 'B', 'P': 'C', 'Q': 'D', 'R': 'E', 'S': 'F', 'T': 'G', 'U': 'H', 'V': 'I', 'W': 'J', 'X': 'K', 'Y': 'L', 'Z': 'M', 'a': 'n', 'b': 'o', 'c': 'p', 'd': 'q', 'e': 'r', 'f': 's', 'g': 't', 'h': 'u', 'i': 'v', 'j': 'w', 'k': 'x', 'l': 'y', 'm': 'z', 'n': 'a', 'o': 'b', 'p': 'c', 'q': 'd', 'r': 'e', 's': 'f', 't': 'g', 'u': 'h', 'v': 'i', 'w': 'j', 'x': 'k', 'y': 'l', 'z': 'm'}
>>>
>>> s = "Quartz glyph job vext cwm porshrop finks?!"
>>> print("".join(table.get(c, c) for c in s))
Dhnegm tylcu wbo irkg pjz cbefuebc svaxf?!

For Python 3, the method str.translate() (with str.maketrans()) can be used:

>>> x, y = zip(*gen_rot13_table(chr))
>>> ''.join(x)
'ABCDEFGHIJKLMNOPQRSTUVWXYZabcdefghijklmnopqrstuvwxyz'
>>> ''.join(y)
'NOPQRSTUVWXYZABCDEFGHIJKLMnopqrstuvwxyzabcdefghijklm'
>>> table = str.maketrans(''.join(x), ''.join(y))
>>> table
{65: 78, 66: 79, 67: 80, 68: 81, 69: 82, 70: 83, 71: 84, 72: 85, 73: 86, 74: 87, 75: 88, 76: 89, 77: 90, 78: 65, 79: 66, 80: 67, 81: 68, 82: 69, 83: 70, 84: 71, 85: 72, 86: 73, 87: 74, 88: 75, 89: 76, 90: 77, 97: 110, 98: 111, 99: 112, 100: 113, 101: 114, 102: 115, 103: 116, 104: 117, 105: 118, 106: 119, 107: 120, 108: 121, 109: 122, 110: 97, 111: 98, 112: 99, 113: 100, 114: 101, 115: 102, 116: 103, 117: 104, 118: 105, 119: 106, 120: 107, 121: 108, 122: 109}
>>>
>>> print(s.translate(table))
Dhnegm tylcu wbo irkg pjz cbefuebc svaxf?!

== See also ==
- Cryptanalysis
- Atbash
