= Ellendale =

Ellendale may refer to:

United States

- Ellendale, Delaware
- Ellendale, Minnesota
- Ellendale, North Carolina
- Ellendale, North Dakota
- Ellendale, Oregon
- Ellendale, Tennessee

Australia

- Ellendale, Tasmania
- Alternative name for the Day Cottage
