= David Kahn (writer) =

American historian and writer (1930–2024)

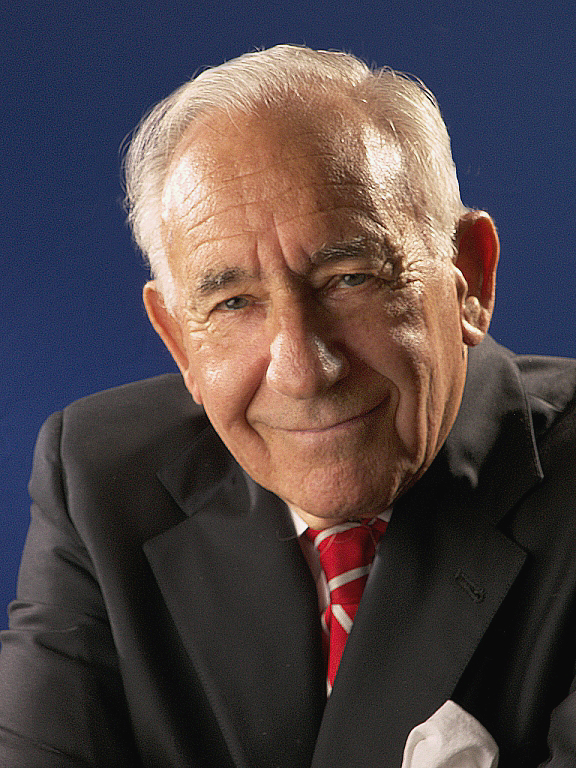
- Kahn in 2009
- Born: February 7, 1930; New York City, U.S.
- Died: January 23, 2024 (aged 93); New York City, U.S.
- Occupations: Historian, journalist, writer
- Spouse: Susanne Fiedler (divorced)
- Children: Oliver and Michael
- Writing career
- Notable work: The Codebreakers – The Story of Secret Writing

David Kahn (February 7, 1930 – January 23, 2024) was an American historian, journalist, and writer. He wrote extensively on the history of cryptography and military intelligence.

Kahn's first published book, The Codebreakers – The Story of Secret Writing (1967), has been widely considered to be a definitive account of the history of cryptography.

== Biography ==
David Kahn was born in New York City to Florence Abraham Kahn, a glass manufacturer, and Jesse Kahn, a lawyer, and grew up in Great Neck, New York, on Long Island.

Kahn said he traced his interest in cryptography to reading Fletcher Pratt's Secret and Urgent (1939) as a boy. Kahn was a founding editor of the Cryptologia journal. In 1969, Kahn married Susanne Fiedler; they divorced in 1994. They have two sons, Oliver and Michael.

Kahn attended Bucknell University, graduating in 1951. After graduation, he was in the Army Reserve and worked as a part-time ice cream truck driver, as well as being a member of the American Cryptogram Association.

Kahn served as a copy editor at the International Herald Tribune in Paris in the 1960s.

He was an associate professor of journalism at New York University from 1975 to 1979. He later worked as an assistant op-ed editor at Newsday from 1979 to 1998.

Kahn also taught courses on military intelligence at Yale University and Columbia University.

It was during this period that he wrote an article for The New York Times Magazine about two defectors from the National Security Agency. It was the origin of his monumental book, The Codebreakers.

== The Codebreakers ==
The Codebreakers comprehensively chronicles the history of cryptography from ancient Egypt to the time of its writing. It is widely regarded as the best account of the history of cryptography up to its publication. Most of the editing, German translating, and insider contributions were from American World War II cryptographer Bradford Hardie III. William Crowell, the former deputy director of the National Security Agency, was quoted in Newsday as saying, "Before he (Kahn) came along, the best you could do was buy an explanatory book that usually was too technical and terribly dull."

Kahn, then a newspaper journalist, was contracted to write a book on cryptography in 1961. He began writing it part-time, at one point quitting his regular job to work on it full-time. The book was to include information on the National Security Agency (NSA), and according to author James Bamford writing in 1982, the agency attempted to stop its publication and considered publishing a negative review of Kahn's work in the press to discredit him. A committee of the United States Intelligence Board concluded that the book was "a possibly valuable support to foreign COMSEC [communications security] authorities" and recommended "further low-key actions as possible, but short of legal action, to discourage Mr. Kahn or his prospective publishers." Kahn's publisher, the Macmillan Company, handed over the manuscript to the federal government for review without Kahn's permission on March 4, 1966. Kahn and Macmillan eventually agreed to remove some material from the manuscript, particularly concerning the relationship between the NSA and its British counterpart, the GCHQ, because Kahn felt pressured by the intelligence community.

The Codebreakers did not cover most of the history concerning the breaking of the German Enigma machine (which became public knowledge only in the 1970s). Nor did it cover the advent of strong cryptography in the public domain, beginning with the invention of public key cryptography and the specification of the Data Encryption Standard in the mid-1970s. An updated edition in 1996 included an additional chapter covering events since the original publication.

== Later career ==
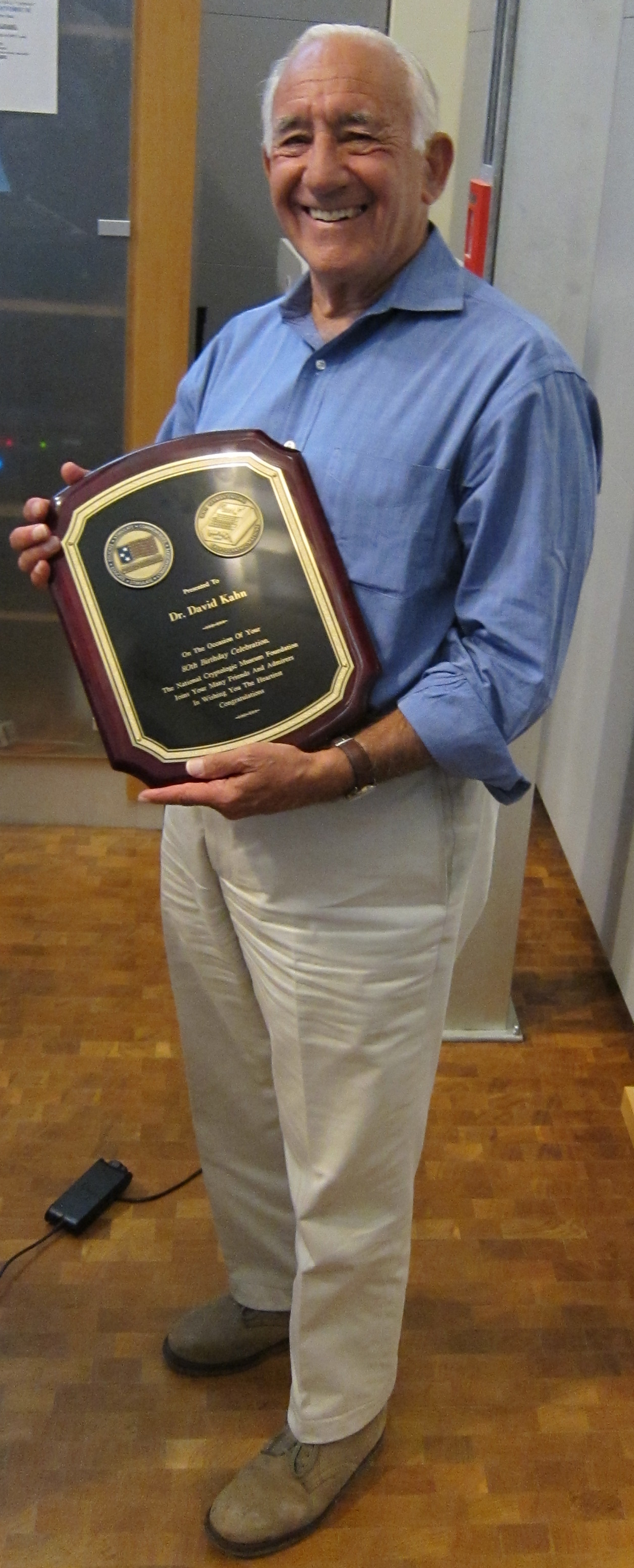
Dr. David Kahn with a plaque from the National Cryptologic Museum Foundation to commemorate his 80th birthday in 2010

Kahn was awarded a doctorate (D.Phil.) from Oxford University in 1974, in modern German history under the supervision of the then-Regius Professor of Modern History, Hugh Trevor-Roper.

Kahn continued his work as a reporter and op-ed editor for Newsday until 1998 and served as a journalism professor at New York University.

Despite past differences between Kahn and the National Security Agency over the information in The Codebreakers, Kahn was selected in 1995 to become NSA's scholar-in-residence.

In 2010, Kahn donated his collection of cryptologic materials to the National Cryptologic Museum. The collection included more than 2,800 books and extensive research materials accumulated during his career. The collection is housed at the NCM library and is non-circulating (that is, items cannot be checked out or loaned out), but photocopying and photography of items in the collection are allowed. In 2020, Kahn was inducted into the NSA/CSS Cryptologic Hall of Honor for his contributions to the study of cryptologic history.

== Personal life and death ==
Kahn lived in New York City. He also lived in Washington, D.C.; Paris, France; Freiburg, Germany; Oxford, England; and Great Neck, New York. Kahn died at his home in the Bronx on January 23, 2024, at the age of 93.

== Publications ==
- Plaintext in the new unabridged: An examination of the definitions on cryptology in Webster's Third New International Dictionary (Crypto Press 1963)
- The Codebreakers – The Story of Secret Writing (ISBN 978-0-684-83130-5) (1967)
- Hitler's Spies: German Military Intelligence in World War II (Macmillan 1978) (ISBN 0-02-560610-7)
- The Codebreakers – The Story of Secret Writing Revised edition (ISBN 0-684-83130-9) (1996)
- Cryptology goes Public (Council on Foreign Relations 1979)
- Notes & correspondence on the origin of polyalphabetic substitution (1980)
- Codebreaking in World Wars I and II: The major successes and failures, their causes and their effects (Cambridge University Press 1980)
- Kahn on Codes: Secrets of the New Cryptology (Macmillan 1984) (ISBN 978-0-02-560640-1)
- Cryptology: Machines, History and Methods by Cipher Deavours and David Kahn (Artech House 1989) (ISBN 978-0-89006-399-6)
- Seizing the Enigma: The Race to Break the German U-Boats Codes, 1939–1943 (Houghton Mifflin 1991) (ISBN 978-0-395-42739-2)
- The Reader of Gentlemen's Mail: Herbert O. Yardley and the Birth of American Codebreaking (Yale University Press 2004) (ISBN 978-0-300-09846-4)
- How I Discovered World War II's Greatest Spy and Other Stories of Intelligence and Code, Boca Raton : CRC Press, Taylor & Francis Group, 2014. ISBN 978-1466561991

== Sources ==
- Bamford, James (1982). The Puzzle Palace: Inside the National Security Agency, America's Most Secret Intelligence Organization. Penguin. ISBN 978-0-14-006748-4.
- Kahn, David (1967). The Codebreakers: The Comprehensive History of Secret Communication from Ancient Times to the Internet. Scribner (later reprinted by Macmillan, 1996). ISBN 978-0-684-83130-5.
