= Scytale =

Encryption tool used to perform a transposition cipher

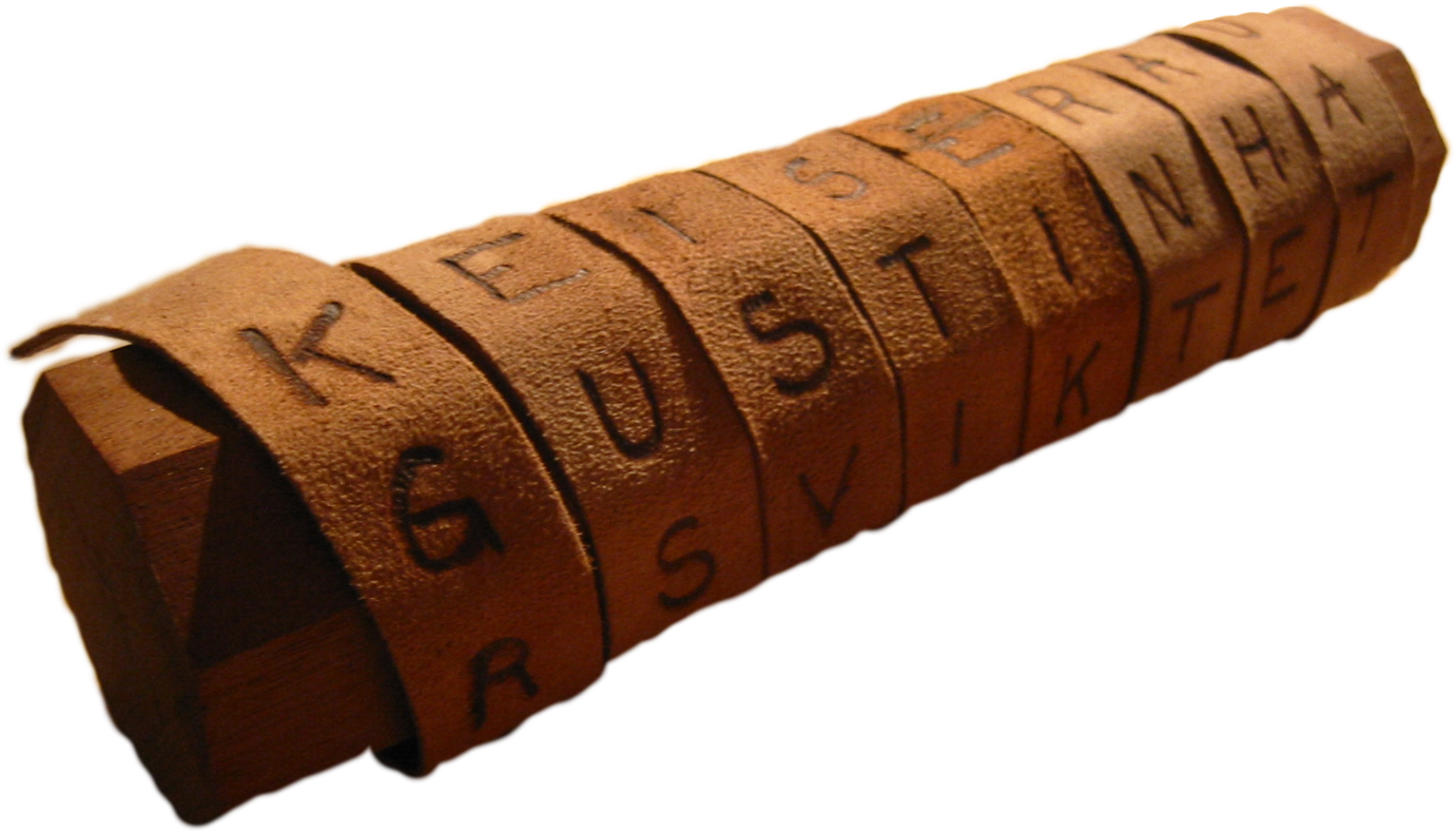
A scytale with a leather strip

In cryptography, a scytale (/ˈskɪtəliː/; /ˈskaɪteɪl/; also transliterated skytale, Ancient Greek: σκυτάλη skutálē "baton, cylinder", also σκύταλον skútalon) is a tool used to perform a transposition cipher, consisting of a cylinder with a strip of parchment wound around it on which a message is written. The ancient Greeks, and the Spartans in particular, are said to have used this cipher to communicate during military campaigns.

The recipient uses a rod of the same diameter on which the parchment is wrapped to read the message.

== Encrypting ==
Suppose the rod allows one to write four letters around in a circle and five letters down the side of it. The plaintext could be: Meet us at the park today.

To encrypt, one simply writes across the leather:

_____________________________________________________________
       |   |   |   |   |   |  |
       | M | e | e | t | u |  |
     __| s | a | t | t | h |__|
    |  | e | p | a | r | k |
    |  | t | o | d | a | y |
    |  |   |   |   |   |   |
_____________________________________________________________

so the ciphertext becomes Mseteapoetadttrauhky after unwinding.

If the message is too short to fill the space evenly, extra padding letters (such as "X") can be added to the end.

== Decrypting ==
To decrypt, all one must do is wrap the leather strip around the rod and read across. An example ciphertext is Iotoctydamoaneuynetx. Every fourth letter will appear on the same line. After the re-insertion of spaces, and discarding the "x" character at the end, the plaintext becomes I cannot meet you today.

== History ==
From indirect evidence, the scytale was first mentioned by the Greek poet Archilochus, who lived in the 7th century BC. Other Greek and Roman writers during the following centuries also mentioned it; however, it was not until Apollonius of Rhodes (middle of the 3rd century BC) that a clear indication of its use as a cryptographic device appeared. A description of how it operated is not known from before Plutarch (50–120 AD):

The dispatch-scroll is of the following character. When the ephors send out an admiral or a general, they make two round pieces of wood exactly alike in length and thickness, so that each corresponds to the other in its dimensions, and keep one themselves, while they give the other to their envoy. These pieces of wood they call scytalae. Whenever, then, they wish to send some secret and important message, they make a scroll of parchment long and narrow, like a leathern strap, and wind it round their scytale, leaving no vacant space thereon, but covering its surface all round with the parchment. After doing this, they write what they wish on the parchment, just as it lies wrapped about the scytale; and when they have written their message, they take the parchment off and send it, without the piece of wood, to the commander. He, when he has received it, cannot otherwise get any meaning out of it,--since the letters have no connection, but are disarranged,--unless he takes his own scytale and winds the strip of parchment about it, so that, when its spiral course is restored perfectly, and that which follows is joined to that which precedes, he reads around the staff, and so discovers the continuity of the message. And the parchment, like the staff, is called scytale, as the thing measured bears the name of the measure.

— Plutarch, Lives (Lysander 19), ed. Bernadotte Perrin.

Due to difficulties in reconciling the description of Plutarch with the earlier accounts, and circumstantial evidence such as the cryptographic weakness of the device, several authors have suggested that the scytale was used for conveying messages in plaintext and that Plutarch's description is mythological.

== Message authentication hypothesis ==
An alternative hypothesis is that the scytale was used for message authentication rather than encryption. Only if the sender wrote the message around a scytale of the same diameter as the receiver's would the receiver be able to read it. It would therefore be difficult for enemy spies to inject false messages into the communication between two commanders.

Nonetheless, any person intercepting a scytale message, and having heard about the method, could with little difficulty find out the rod size needed (a kind of brute-force attack); once knowing that, it would be easy to supplant the sender and forge new messages.

== See also ==
- Caesar cipher
