= Beaufort (surname) =

Surname list

Beaufort is the name of a noble family of 14th and 15th-century England, descended from John of Gaunt, 1st Duke of Lancaster. For a list of individual Beauforts, see House of Beaufort.

- Jacques-Antoine Beaufort (1721–1784), French painter

Beaufort or de Beaufort is also the surname of members of a particular Huguenot family

- Count Francis de Beaufort (1661–1714), Court Chancellor to the Prince of Lippe-Detmond
- Daniel Cornelius de Beaufort (1700–1788), Church of England, and later, Church of Ireland Clergyman
- Daniel Augustus Beaufort (1739–1821), Church of Ireland Clergyman, author and map maker
- Sir Francis Beaufort (1774–1857), Irish hydrographer and naval officer, creator of the Beaufort scale, namesake of the Beaufort Sea
- Louisa Beaufort (1781–1863), Irish antiquarian, author and artist
- Willem Hendrik de Beaufort (1845–1918), Dutch statesman and essayist
- Lieven Ferdinand de Beaufort (1879–1968), Dutch biologist
- Carel Godin de Beaufort (1934–1964), Dutch Porsche Formula 1 Driver 1957 - 1964

== See also ==
- Duke of Beaufort (England), a dukedom in the Peerage of England
- Duke of Beaufort (France), a title in French nobility
