= Beaufort =

Beaufort may refer to:

== People and titles ==
- Beaufort (surname)
- House of Beaufort, English nobility
- Duke of Beaufort (England), a title in the peerage of England
- Duke of Beaufort (France), a title in the French nobility

== Places ==
=== Australia ===
- Beaufort, Queensland, a locality in the Barcaldine Region, Queensland
- Beaufort, South Australia
- Beaufort, Victoria
- Beaufort Inlet (Western Australia), an inlet located in the Great Southern region of Western Australia

=== Canada ===
- Beaufort Range, Vancouver Island, British Columbia

=== France ===
- Beaufort, Haute-Garonne
- Beaufort, Hérault
- Beaufort, Isère
- Beaufort, Jura
- Beaufort, Nord
- Beaufort, Savoie
- Beaufort-Blavincourt, Pas-de-Calais
- Beaufort-en-Argonne, Meuse
- Beaufort-en-Santerre, Somme
- Beaufort-en-Vallée, Maine-et-Loire
- Beaufort-sur-Gervanne, Drôme
- Montmorency-Beaufort, Aube

=== Ireland ===
- Beaufort, County Kerry, a village

=== Lebanon ===
- Beaufort Castle, Lebanon

=== Luxembourg ===
- Beaufort, Luxembourg

=== Malaysia ===
- Beaufort, Malaysia
- Beaufort (federal constituency)

=== Polar regions ===
- Beaufort Sea in the Arctic Ocean
- Beaufort Island, an island in Antarctica's Ross Sea

=== South Africa ===
- Beaufort West, largest town in the arid Great Karoo
- Fort Beaufort, town in the Amatole District of Eastern Cape Province
- Port Beaufort, settlement in Eden in the Western Cape province

=== United Kingdom ===
- Beaufort, Blaenau Gwent, Wales
- Beaufort Castle, Scotland
- Beaufort's Dyke, between Scotland and Northern Ireland

=== United States ===
- Beaufort, North Carolina
- Beaufort County, North Carolina
- Beaufort Inlet (North Carolina), located in the Outer Banks
- Beaufort, South Carolina
- Beaufort County, South Carolina

== Military uses ==
- Bristol Beaufort, a large British torpedo bomber
- CSS Beaufort, a Confederate Navy gunboat
- Beaufort, a transport which served as headquarters for the Governor of Nova Scotia, Edward Cornwallis, for some Nova Scotia Council meetings
- Marine Corps Air Station Beaufort, a United States Marine Corps air station near Beaufort, South Carolina

== Transportation ==
- Beaufort (automobiles), a German manufacturer of automobiles solely for the British market from 1902 to 1910
- Beaufort (dinghy), a sailing dinghy designed by Ian Proctor
- Beaufort, one of the GWR 3031 Class locomotives that were built for and run on the Great Western Railway between 1891 and 1915, formerly named Bellerophon before 1895
- Beaufort railway station, Victoria

== Other uses ==
- Beaufort (film), a 2007 Israeli Oscar-nominated film, referring to Beaufort Castle, Lebanon
- Beaufort (novel), title of the 2007 English-language translation of the novel אם יש גן עדן (trsl. Im Yesh Gan Eden), basis for the film
- Beaufort Castle (disambiguation)
- Beaufort cheese, a French cheese
- Beaufort cipher, an encryption technique using a substitution cipher
- Beaufort County Schools (disambiguation)
- Beaufort Group, subdivisions of the Karoo Supergroup
- Beaufort War Hospital, Bristol, England
- Beaufort scale, an empirical measure for describing wind intensity
