= Francis Beaufort (disambiguation) =

Francis Beaufort (1774–1857) was an Irish hydrographer and officer in the Royal Navy.

Francis Beaufort may also refer to:

- Francis Lestock Beaufort (1815–1879), son of the above
- Francis de Beaufort (1661–1714), Dutch court chancellor to the prince of Lippe-Detmold
