= Daniel de Beaufort =

Daniel de Beaufort may refer to:

- Daniel Cornelius de Beaufort (1700–1788), English Anglican minister, father of Daniel Augustus
- Daniel Augustus Beaufort (1739–1821), English Anglican priest and geographer, son of Daniel Cornelius
