= Louisa Beaufort =

Irish antiquarian, author and artist

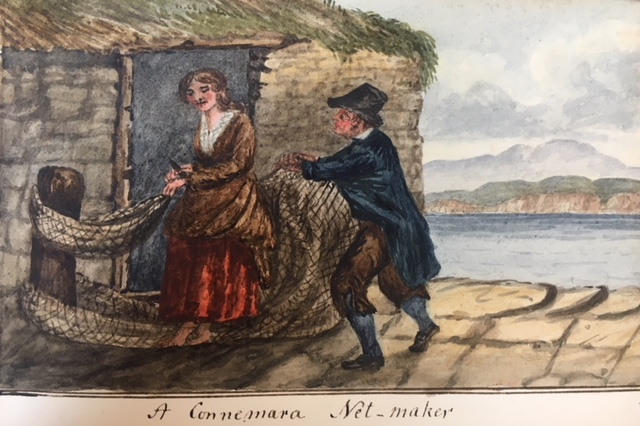
Watercolour by Louisa Beaufort, 1857.

Louisa Catherine Beaufort (1781–1863) was an Irish antiquarian, writer and artist.

== Family ==
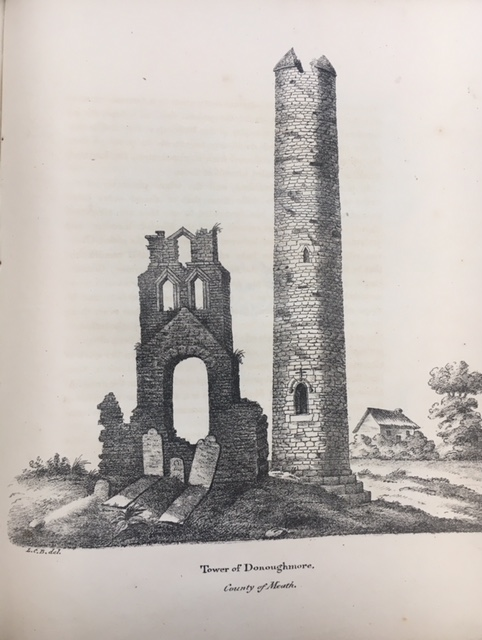
Tower of Donoughmore, Co. Meath. Lithograph by Louisa Beaufort, 1827.

Beaufort was the daughter of Rev Daniel Augustus Beaufort and Mary Waller (1739–1831), daughter of William Waller of Allenstown. Her grandfather was from the Huguenot community in London and moved to Ireland as chaplain to the viceroy. She had two sisters, Harriet (called Henrietta) and Frances Anne Beaufort, and two brothers, William and Francis. Two other sisters died in infancy. Her sister Frances, a botanist and author, married, as his fourth wife, Richard Lovell Edgeworth, and thus became step-mother to the novelist Maria Edgeworth. W. J. McCormack states that both Daniel and Louisa advised Maria Edgeworth in her writing of The Absentee.

== Achievements ==
Louisa Beaufort had a paper presented to the Royal Irish Academy in October 1827 on the architecture and antiquities of Ireland prior to the twelfth century; this essay was then published. The work is illustrated by lithographs by the author. Beaufort was the first woman to have a paper presented to and published by the Academy. Her opportunity may have arisen because her father was one of the founders of that institution in 1785, and he served as its librarian from 1788-91.

== Legacy ==
Louisa Beaufort wrote a number of tour journals which are among the manuscripts in the Library of Trinity College. Also in the Library is a book of watercolours of antiquities which Beaufort dedicated to her brother Admiral Francis Beaufort in 1857. The journal, of which these are the illustrations, is at the Huntington Library, San Marino, California.
