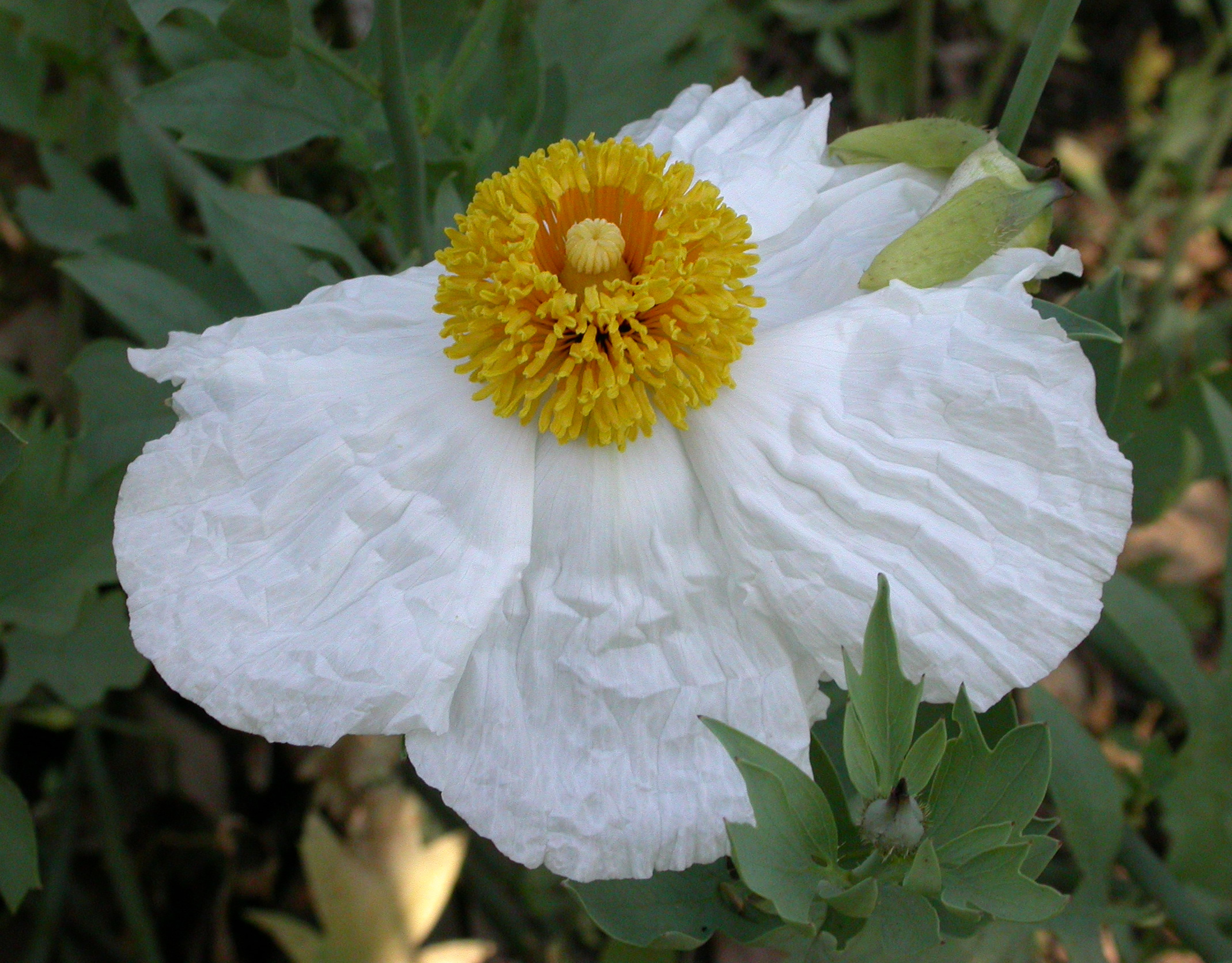

Scientific classification
- Kingdom: Plantae
- Clade: Embryophytes
- Clade: Tracheophytes
- Clade: Spermatophytes
- Clade: Angiosperms
- Clade: Eudicots
- Order: Ranunculales
- Family: Papaveraceae
- Genus: Romneya
- Species: R. trichocalyx

Binomial name
- Romneya trichocalyx Eastw.

= Romneya trichocalyx =

Species of flowering plant in the poppy family

Romneya trichocalyx, the bristly Matilija poppy or hairy Matilija poppy, is a species of flowering plant in the poppy family. This poppy is native to San Diego, Ventura, and Santa Barbara counties in California, as well as Baja California, Mexico, where it grows in dry canyons in chaparral and coastal sage scrub plant communities. Like its relative Romneya coulteri, it is used as an ornamental plant, kept for its large, showy flowers.

It is a shrub 1 to 2.5 meters (3 ft 3 in to 8 ft 2 in) tall, growing from a network of rhizomes. The gray-green leaves are each divided into a few lance-shaped lobes. The inflorescence is a large, solitary flower with six white petals each 4–8 cm (1.6–3.1 in) long. At the center of the flower is a cluster of many yellow stamens. The fruit is a bristly capsule 2.5–3.5 cm (0.98–1.38 in) long containing many tiny seeds.

It is distinguished from R. coulteri by its hairy sepals and smaller flowers and fruits. In the past the two species were placed in synonymy, but they are currently regarded as distinct by California botanists.

The genus is named after the Irish astronomer John Thomas Romney Robinson.
