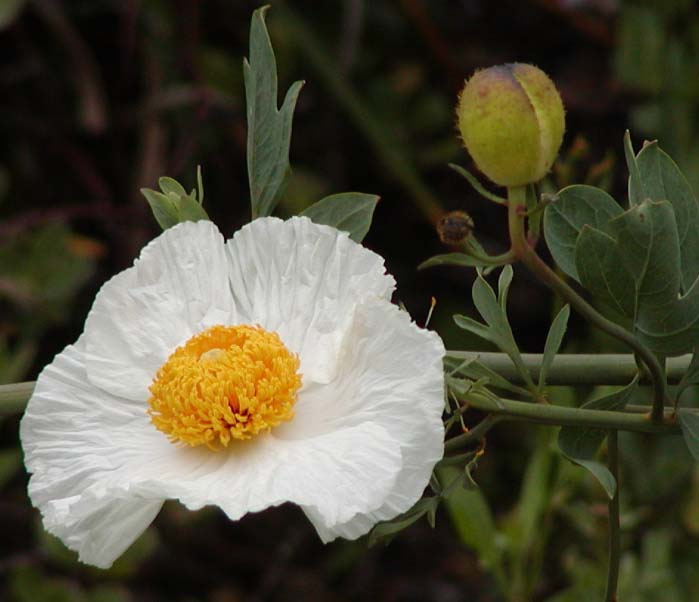
- Matilija poppy flower and flower bud.

Scientific classification
- Kingdom: Plantae
- Clade: Tracheophytes
- Clade: Angiosperms
- Clade: Eudicots
- Order: Ranunculales
- Family: Papaveraceae
- Subfamily: Papaveroideae
- Tribe: Papavereae
- Genus: Romneya; Harv.

Species
- Romneya coulteri; Romneya trichocalyx

= Romneya =

Matilija poppy

Genus of flowering plants in the poppy family Papaveraceae

Romneya is a genus of flowering plants belonging to the poppy family (Papaveraceae). There are two species in the genus Romneya, which was named after the Irish astronomer John Thomas Romney Robinson; the first discovered species R. coulteri commemorates Romney Robinson's close friendship with the Irish botanist Thomas Coulter. They are known commonly as Matilija poppies (/məˈtɪlɪhɑː/ mə-TIL-i-hah), bush poppies, California poppies, or tree poppies. The common name "Matilija" is said to come from the Chumash leader, Chief Matilija. They are also known as the "fried egg flower" or the "fried egg plant" due to their bright yellow stamen, which creates the image of a sunny-side-up egg. They are native to chaparral and coastal scrub habitats in Southern California and Baja California.

They are perennial subshrubs with woody stems. They may grow to a height of 2.5 meters (8.2 feet) and a width of 1 m (39 in), with the flowers up to 13 cm (5.1 in) across. The silvery green leaves are deeply cut, with a small fringe of hairs at the margins.

They are notable for their large, satiny white flowers and intense boss of yellow stamens, blooming in late spring and summer. Their thin white petals have a satiny crepe-like texture. Romneya produce the largest flowers of any members of the poppy family. These flowers prefer a warm, sunny spot against a south-facing wall with fertile soil with good water drainage. They are not easily grown but once established are difficult to remove. In the wild, they are known as "fire followers" because they need smoke to germinate and can be frequently, but not exclusively, found in burned areas. When these flowers are grown on a hillside, they can act as a soil binder and prevent erosion. Matilija poppies were reportedly used medicinally by the Chumash to treat skin and gum problems, and stomach aches.

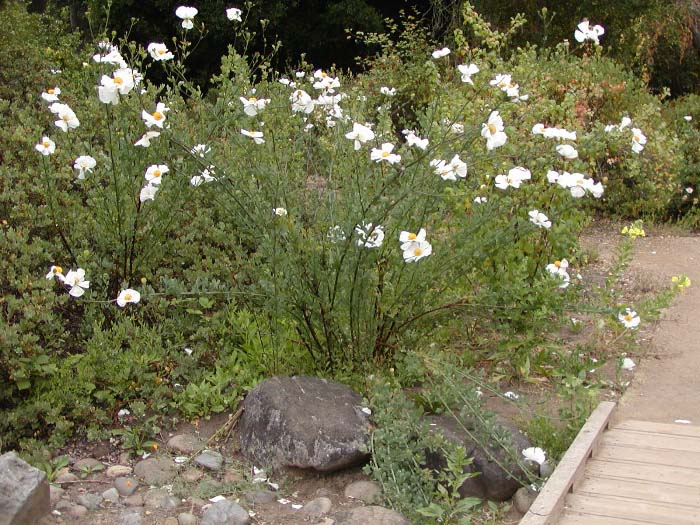
Matilija poppy at Strybing Arboretum, San Francisco

The two species are:

- Romneya coulteri Harv. – Coulter's Matilija poppy
- Romneya trichocalyx Eastw. – Bristly Matilija poppy. Some consider this a variety of Romneya coulteri, but it is accepted in recent manuals.
