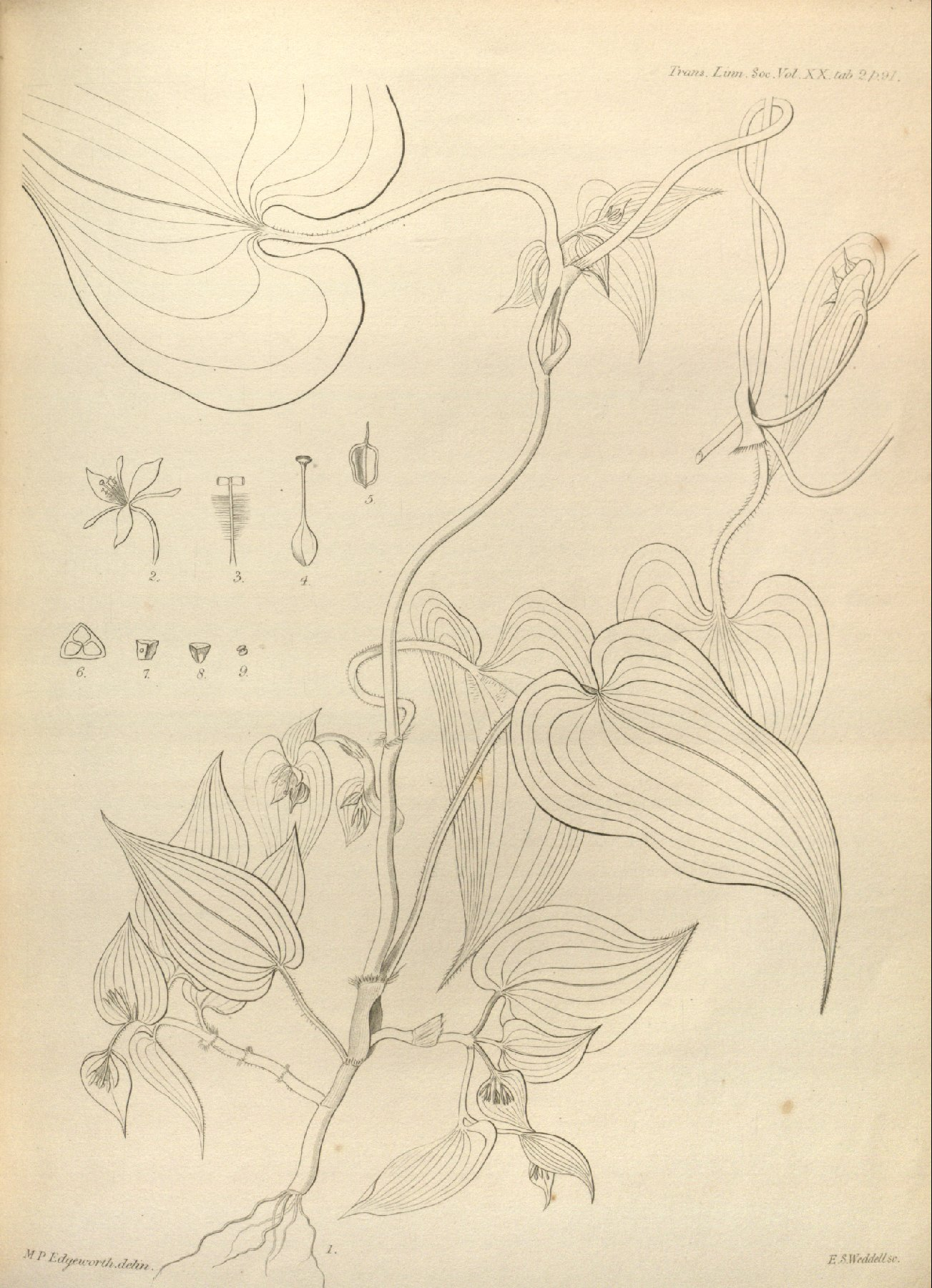

Scientific classification
- Kingdom: Plantae
- Clade: Tracheophytes
- Clade: Angiosperms
- Clade: Monocots
- Clade: Commelinids
- Order: Commelinales
- Family: Commelinaceae
- Subfamily: Commelinoideae
- Tribe: Tradescantieae
- Subtribe: Streptoliriinae
- Genus: Streptolirion
- Species: S. volubile

Binomial name
- Streptolirion volubile Edgw.

= Streptolirion volubile =

Genus of flowering plants

Streptolirion volubile is a species of climbing monocotyledonous flowering plants in the dayflower family. It has a broad distribution in Asia, from the Russian Far East and Korea through China to Indochina and the Himalayas.

Three subdivisions are accepted.

- Streptolirion volubile var. angustifolia Aver. – Vietnam
- Streptolirion volubile subsp. khasianum (C.B.Clarke) D.Y.Hong – eastern Himalaya to south-central China and Vietnam. It is a stronger climber than subsp. volubile and covered with erect brown hairs.
- Streptolirion volubile subsp. volubile – Russian Far East and Korea through China to Indochina and the Himalayas.
