= William Edgeworth =

Irish civil engineer

William Edgeworth (1794?–1829) was an Anglo-Irish civil engineer.

== Life ==
He was the son of Richard Lovell Edgeworth and his third wife Elizabeth, making him one of a very large Anglo-Irish family, including the novelist Maria Edgeworth. His father moved to Ireland to take care of an estate near Edgeworthstown. William Edgeworth's practical interests initially followed those of his father, such as surveying; he moved into cartography.

Edgeworth was involved in the construction of the Church of Ireland parish church at Collon in County Louth, where he worked with Daniel Augustus Beaufort (father of Richard Lovell Edgeworth's fourth wife). Others were William Fletcher (killed there in the building work), and Samuel Jones, brought up by William Edgeworth.

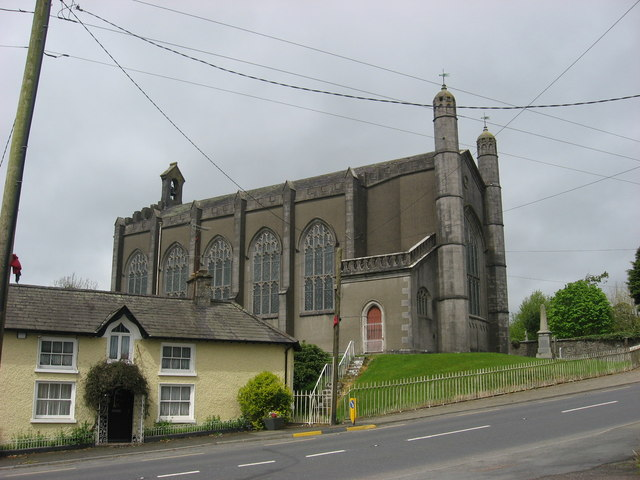
Church of Ireland parish church at Collon, founded 1811, on which the Edgeworth family worked.

Edgeworth's surveying work in Ireland included soundings in the River Inny and the mapping of bogs. Irish Bogs Commission was active in the period 1809 to 1814, and under an Act from 1774 there was funding for county maps from grand juries; Edgeworth reported on issues of bog drainage and reclamation. His 1813 map of County Longford was noted, and was followed by a map of County Roscommon with Richard Griffith. He worked also with William Hampton and John Brinkley. Unlike some other surveyors in Ireland at the time, he encountered little opposition to his work; he took a tactful and communicative line with local people.

William Strutt, a connection of his father's through Lunar Society who became a close friend, gave William Edgeworth introductions to Peter Ewart and George Augustus Lee. He paid a visit to Lee's mills in Manchester.

Later Edgeworth was employed by Alexander Nimmo. This took him to County Galway and County Waterford. He worked on the Glengariff road. Henry Habberly Price engaged him to do a survey of the River Tees, in north-east England, in 1825–7, on behalf of the Tees Navigation Company; this work was later used by the Stockton & Darlington Railway, and for conservancy by William Bald. He carried out an early railway survey of 1828 in Ulster (Armagh to Newry), done in fact two years before that.

Edgeworth was elected a member of the Institution of Civil Engineers in 1829, and was a member of the Royal Irish Academy and the Royal Astronomical Society. He corresponded with William Rowan Hamilton.

Edgeworth died, unmarried, at Edgeworthstown, 21 April 1829.

Charles Babbage wrote, as illustration of economic doctrine, about a "money pump" devised by Edgeworth.
