= Thomas Romney Robinson =

Irish astronomer (1792–1882)

The Reverend Thomas Romney Robinson FRS FRAS
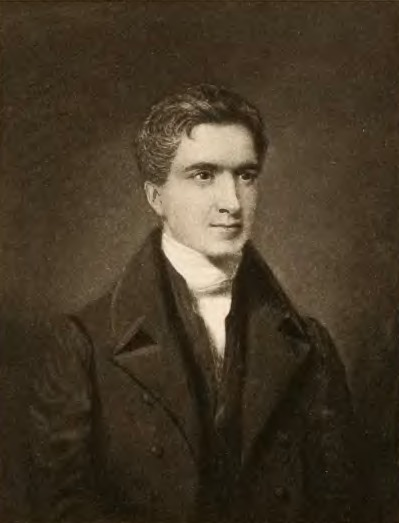
- Robinson early in life
- Born: John Thomas Romney Robinson; 23 April 1792; Dublin, Kingdom of Ireland
- Died: 28 February 1882 (aged 89); Armagh, United Kingdom of Great Britain and Ireland
- Education: Trinity College Dublin (BA)
- Known for: Inventing the cup anemometer
- Spouse: Lucy Jane Edgeworth (m. 1843)
- Relatives: Richard Lovell Edgeworth (father-in-law); Frances Anne Edgeworth (mother-in-law); George Stokes (son-in-law)
- Awards: FRS (1856); Royal Medal (1862); Pour le Mérite (1872
- Scientific career
- Fields: Astronomy
- Workplaces: Armagh Observatory

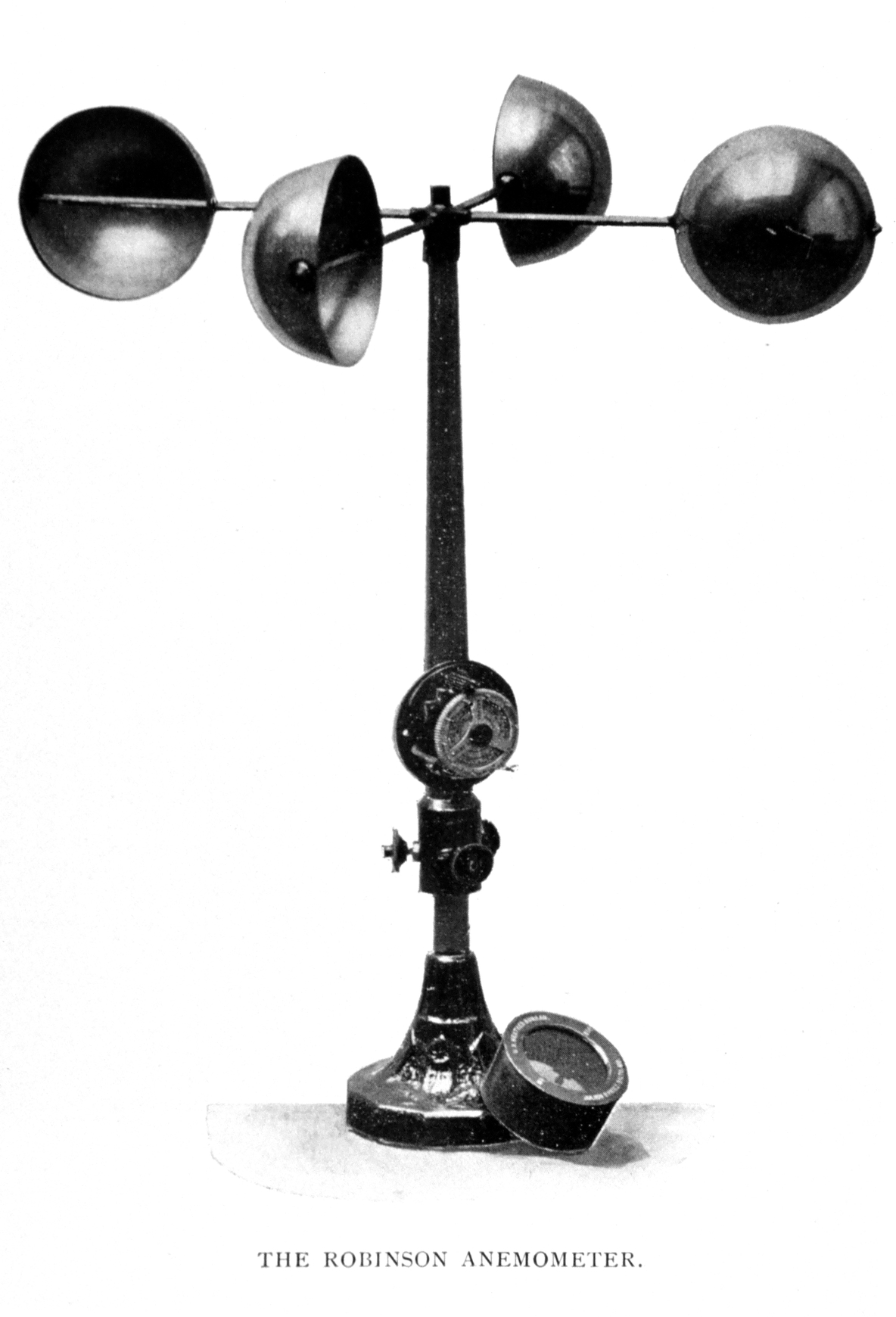
A hemispherical cup anemometer of the type invented in 1846 by John Thomas Romney Robinson

John Thomas Romney Robinson (23 April 1792 – 28 February 1882), usually referred to as Thomas Romney Robinson, was an Irish astronomer. He was the director of the Armagh Observatory, one of the chief astronomical observatories in the UK of its time. He is remembered as inventor of the 4-cup anemometer.

== Biography ==
Robinson was born at St Anne's in Dublin, the son of the English portrait painter Thomas Robinson (d. 1810) and his wife, Ruth Buck (d. 1826). He was educated at Belfast Academy then studied divinity at Trinity College Dublin, where he was elected a Scholar in 1808, graduating BA in 1810 and obtaining a fellowship in 1814, at the age of 22. He was for some years a deputy professor of natural philosophy (physics) at Trinity.

Having been also ordained as an Anglican priest while at Trinity, he obtained the church livings of the Anglican Church at Enniskillen and at Carrickmacross in 1824.

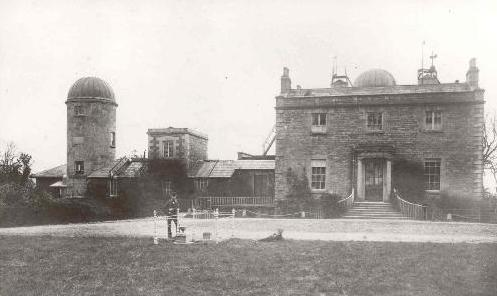
Armagh Observatory, 1883

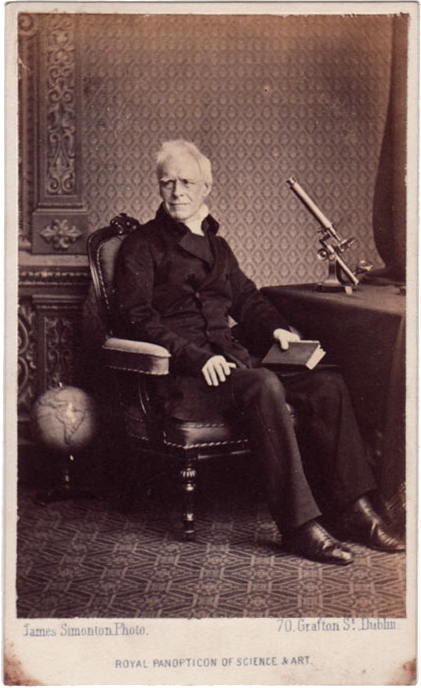
Robinson in the 1850s by James Simonton

In 1823, now aged 30, he additionally gained the appointment of astronomer at the Armagh observatory. From then on he always resided at the Armagh observatory, engaged in researches connected with astronomy and physics, until his death in 1882.

During the 1840s and 1850s Robinson was a frequent visitor to the world's most powerful telescope of that era, the so-called Leviathan of Parsonstown telescope, which had been built by Robinson's friend and colleague William Parsons, 3rd Earl of Rosse. Robinson was active with Parsons in interpreting the higher-resolution views of the night sky produced by Parsons' telescope, particularly with regard to the galaxies and nebulae and he published leading-edge research reports on the question. Back at his own observatory in Armagh, Robinson compiled a large catalogue of stars and wrote many related reports. In 1862 he was awarded a Royal Medal "for the Armagh catalogue of 5345 stars, deduced from observations made at the Armagh Observatory, from the years 1820 up to 1854; for his papers on the construction of astronomical instruments in the memoirs of the Astronomical Society, and his paper on electromagnets in the Transactions of the Royal Irish Academy".

Robinson is also of note as the inventor of a device for measuring the speed of the wind, the Robinson cup-anemometer (1846).

He was president of the Royal Irish Academy from 1851 to 1856, and was a long-time active organiser in the British Association for the Advancement of Science.

Robinson was a friend of Charles Babbage, who said he was "indebted" for having reminded him about the first time he came up with the idea of the calculating machine.

== Family ==
He married twice: firstly Eliza Isabelle Rambaut (d. 1839) and secondly Lucy Jane Edgeworth (1806–1897), the lifelong disabled daughter of the politician Richard Lovell Edgeworth. His daughter Mary Susanna Robinson married the physicist George Gabriel Stokes. Stokes frequently visited Robinson in Armagh in Robinson's later years.

== Recognition ==
On the Moon, Robinson (crater) is named in his honour.

A plant genus and species was named Romneya coulteri (the California tree poppy) in commemoration of him and his close friend Dr. Thomas Coulter in 1833, by the Irish botanist William Henry Harvey.

== Works ==
- Poems by Thomas Romney Robinson, written between the age of seven and thirteen; to which is prefixed A short account of the author (1808)
- On voltaic electricity (1818)
- A system of mechanics, for the use of the students in the University of Dublin (1820)
- Description of a New Air-pump (1825)
- Astronomical Observations made at the Armagh Observatory (1829)
- Astronomical Observations, Part 1, Volume 1 (1829)
- On the Longitude of the Armagh Observatory (1839)
- An Account of the Casting of the Great Speculum by the Earl of Rosse (1 January 1840)
- On the Difference of Longitude Between the Observatories of Armagh and Dublin, Determined by Rocket Signals (1840)
- On the Difference of Longitude between the Observatories of Armagh and Dublin, Determined by Rocket Signals (1 January 1843)
- On the Constant of Refraction, Determined by Observations with the Mural Circle of the Armagh Observatory (1 January 1843)
- On the Effect of Heat in Lessening the Affinities of the Elements of Water (31 December 1846)
- Collection of Articles on Meteorology and Magnetism (1846), coauthor
- On the Effect of Heat in Lessening the Affinities of the Elements of Water (1847)
- On the Relation between the Temperature of Metallic Conductors, and Their Resistance to Electric Currents (1 January 1849)
- On Electro-Magnets (1 January 1850)
- On a Thunder-Shower Observed at Markree Castle, on June 30, 1851 (1 January 1850)
- On the Ordinary Theorem by Which the Magnifying Power of a Telescope Is Determined (1 January 1850)
- Speeches of the Rev. Thomas Romney Robinson, at the Twenty-second Annual Meeting, Held in Belfast, September 1852
- Effects Produced by the Vicinity of a Railroad (1852)
- On the Probable Errors of the Eye and Ear in Transit Observations (1853)
- Labourers together with God: A sermon on 1 Cor. III. 9 (1853)
- Places of 5,345 stars observed from 1828 to 1854, at the Armagh observatory: By Rev. T.R. Robinson (1859)
- Experimental researches on the lifting power of the Electro-Magnet (1859)
- Light: A Lecture (1862)
- On Spectra of Electric Light, as Modified by the Nature of the Electrodes and the Media of Discharge (1862)
- Description of the Great Melbourne Telescope (1869)
- Speeches delivered in the General Convention of the Church of Ireland (1870)

Posthumous

- Rev. Thomas Romney Robinson correspondence (2008)
