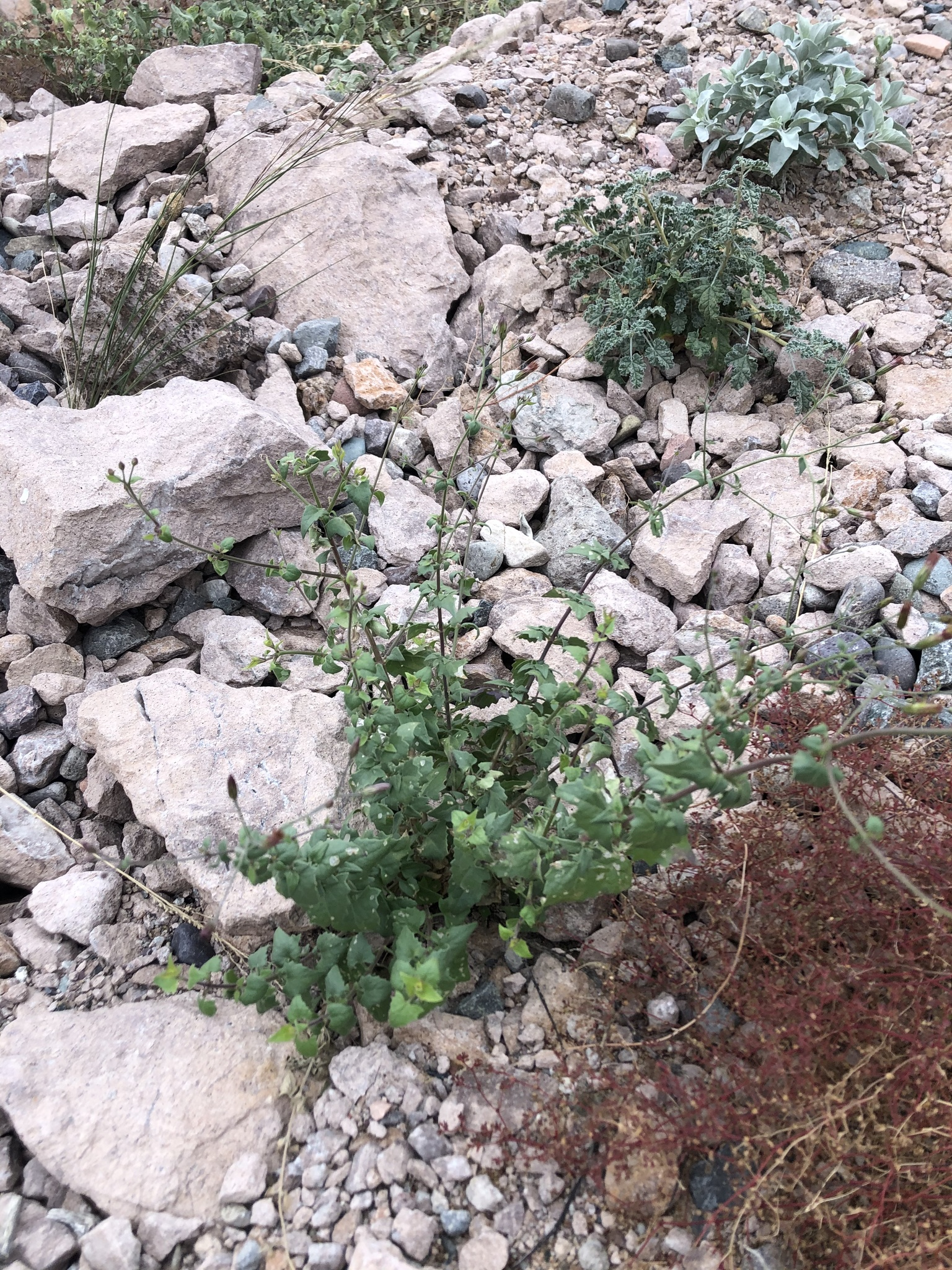

Scientific classification
- Kingdom: Plantae
- Clade: Tracheophytes
- Clade: Angiosperms
- Clade: Eudicots
- Clade: Asterids
- Order: Asterales
- Family: Asteraceae
- Genus: Brickellia
- Species: B. coulteri

Binomial name
- Brickellia coulteri A.Gray

Synonyms
- Brickellia cayucensis M.E.Jones; Brickellia megalodonta Greenm.; Coleosanthus coulteri (A.Gray) Kuntze; Coleosanthus megalodontus (Greenm.) Arthur

= Brickellia coulteri =

Species of flowering plant

Brickellia coulteri, or Coulter's brickellbush, is a North American species of flowering plants in the family Asteraceae. It is native to Mexico (Baja California Sur, Baja California, Sonora, Oaxaca) and the southwestern United States (Arizona, southwestern New Mexico, western Texas).

Brickellia coulteri is a shrub up to 150 cm (60 inches) tall. It has many small flower heads with pale yellow-green disc flowers but no ray flowers.

Varieties

- Brickellia coulteri var. adenopoda (B.L.Rob.) B.L.Turner
- Brickellia coulteri var. coulteri

The species is named in 1852 for Irish botanist Thomas Coulter (1793 – 1843).
