= Montmorency-Beaufort =

Commune in Grand Est, France

- Commune
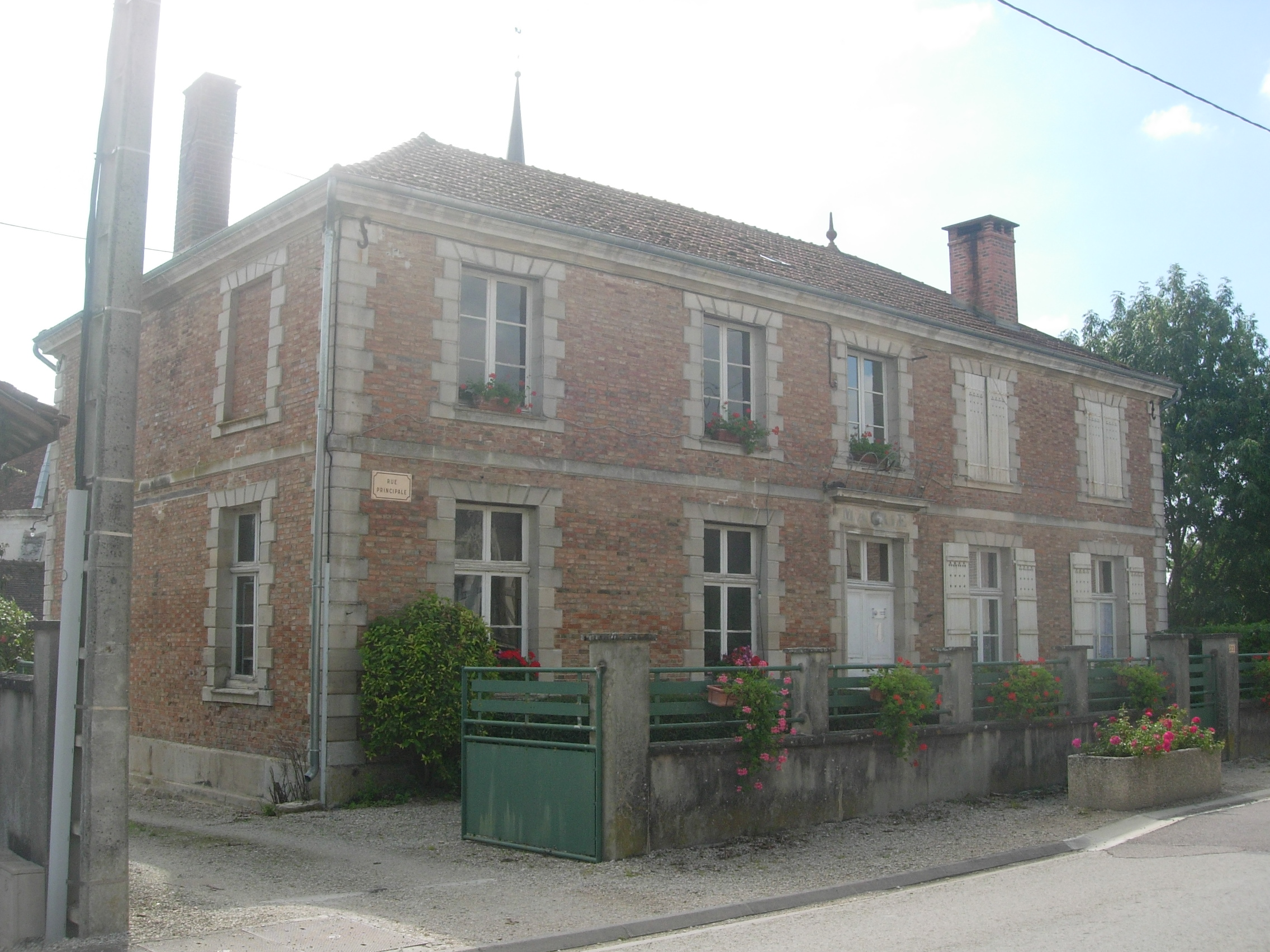
- Town hall

- Coat of arms
- Location of Montmorency-Beaufort
- Location within France Location within Grand Est
- Coordinates: 48°29′14″N 4°33′49″E
- Country: France
- Region: Grand Est
- Department: Aube
- Arrondissement: Bar-sur-Aube
- Canton: Brienne-le-Château

Government
  - Mayor (2020–2026): Michel Burr
- Area^{1}: 9.38 km^{2} (3.62 sq mi)
- Elevation: 124 m (407 ft)
- Highest elevation: 182 m (597 ft)
- Lowest elevation: 112 m (367 ft)
- Population (2023): 134
  - Density: 14.3/km^{2} (37.0/sq mi)
- Time zone: UTC+01:00 (CET)
  - Summer (DST): UTC+02:00 (CEST)
- INSEE/Postal code: 10253 /10330
- ^{1} French Land Register data, which excludes lakes, ponds, glaciers > 1 km^{2} (0.386 sq mi or 247 acres) and river estuaries.

Montmorency-Beaufort (French pronunciation: [mɔ̃mɔʁɑ̃si bofɔʁ]) is a commune in the Aube department in north-central France.

Through the English noble House of Beaufort and the later peerage of Beaufort, both named after the local castle, it is the ultimate origin of most Beaufort toponyms in the English-speaking world.

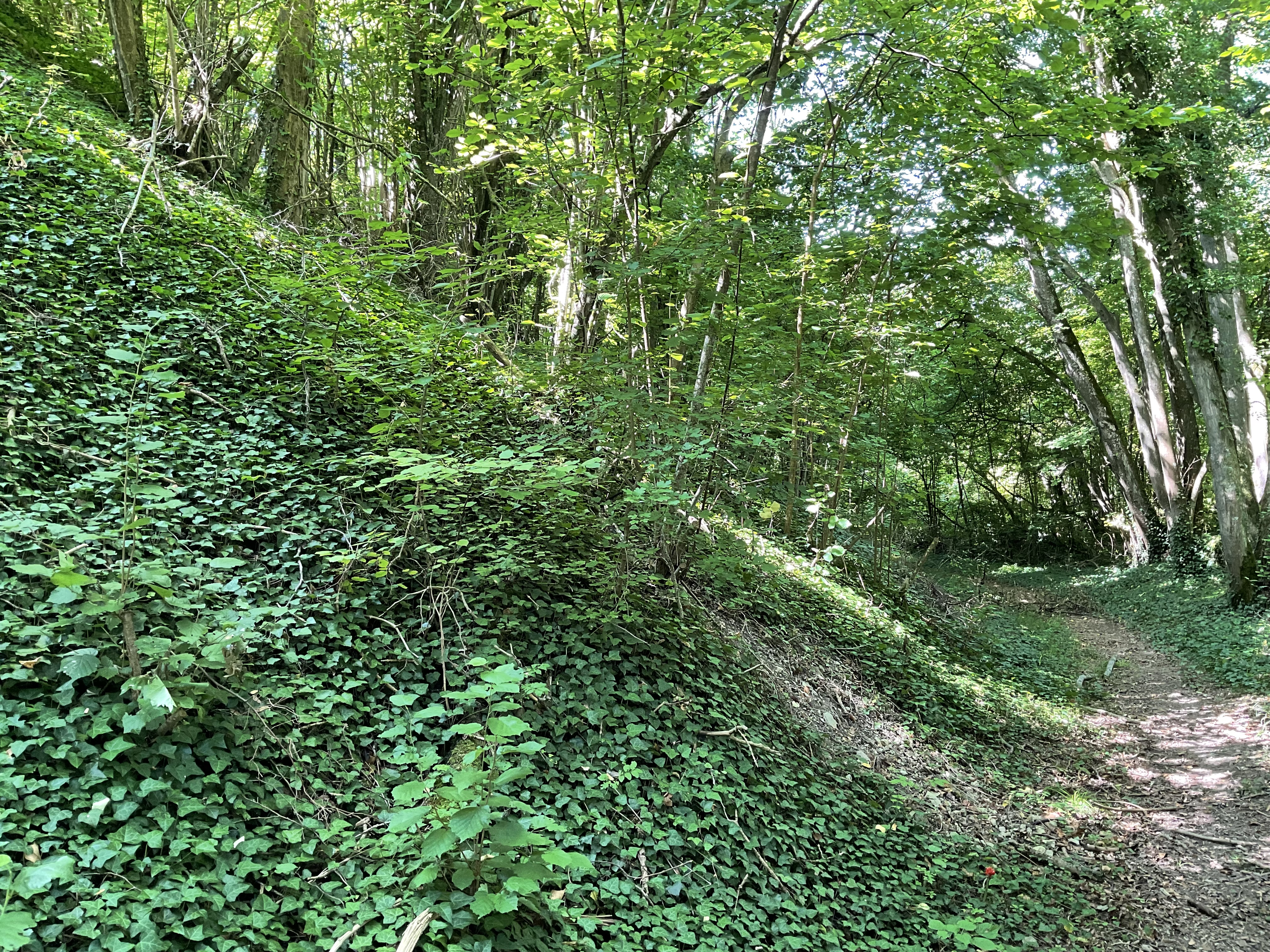
The surviving earthworks of Beaufort Castle in Montmorency Beaufort

== Population ==
Historical population
Year	Pop.	±% p.a.
1968	167	—
1975	128	−3.73%
1982	114	−1.64%
1990	111	−0.33%
1999	121	+0.96%
2007	123	+0.21%
2012	122	−0.16%
2017	137	+2.35%
2023	134	−0.37%
Source: INSEE

== See also ==
- Communes of the Aube department
- House of Beaufort
