= Beaufort Castle =

Beaufort Castle can refer to several places:

- Beaufort Castle, Florennes, Belgium
- Beaufort Castle, France, in the historical region of Auvergne
- Beaufort Castle in Huy, Belgium
- Beaufort Castle, Greece, a Frankish castle in Laconia
- Beaufort Castle, Lebanon
- Beaufort Castle, Luxembourg
- Beaufort Castle, Scotland, near Beauly

== See also ==
- Beaufort (disambiguation)
