= Henrietta Beaufort =

Botanist (1778–1865)

- Born: Harriet Henrietta Beaufort; 1778; Ireland
- Died: 1865 (aged 86–87)
- Occupations: Botanist, author
- Father: Daniel Beaufort

Henrietta Beaufort (1778–1865), earlier Harriet Beaufort, was a botanist born of Anglo-French parents in Ireland. Her Dialogues on Botany for the Use of Young Persons was published in 1819 and aimed to teach plant biology to young readers. Unlike most books on botanicals, Beaufort's did not contain any illustrations. This was because Beaufort believed it was important for people to study nature by experiencing it in real life rather than viewing it in representations.

== Works ==
In her Dialogues on Botany, Beaufort considered it important to delay the teachings of the Linnaean system of classification until she had first provided the basis, physiology. There were no pictures in her book, because she thought it was important for readers to study nature and not the representation of it. Instead, she taught her young readers to learn by dissection and inspection using microscopes. She was criticized by contemporaries for this.

In 1829 John Murray published Bertha’s Journal, without her name appearing as an author.

== Family ==
Beaufort's father, the Reverend Daniel Beaufort, a founding member of the Royal Irish Academy, was her inspiration to become a scientist and she assisted him in many of his botany projects. She had two sisters, Frances and Louisa, and a brother, Francis, who was a hydrographer for the admiralty and was in charge of making marine charts. Her whole family was interested in or connected to science. Both Henrietta and Louisa wrote books anonymously in the hope of supporting their family after their father gave up his clerical position and found himself highly indebted.

Beaufort was related by marriage to the Irish writer Maria Edgeworth as her older sister, Frances, was the fourth wife of Maria's father, Richard Lovell Edgeworth. When the Beaufort family fell into debt, Maria (and her publisher) helped support Henrietta and Louisa, both unmarried, who kept house for their widowed mother.

When her hydrographer brother Francis's confidential diary was decoded, after their deaths, it revealed feelings of guilt he felt over having an incestuous relationship with Henrietta.

== Publications ==
- Dialogues on Botany for the Use of Young Persons (London, 1819)
- Bertha's Journal (London: John Murray, 1829)
