= Samuel Grove =

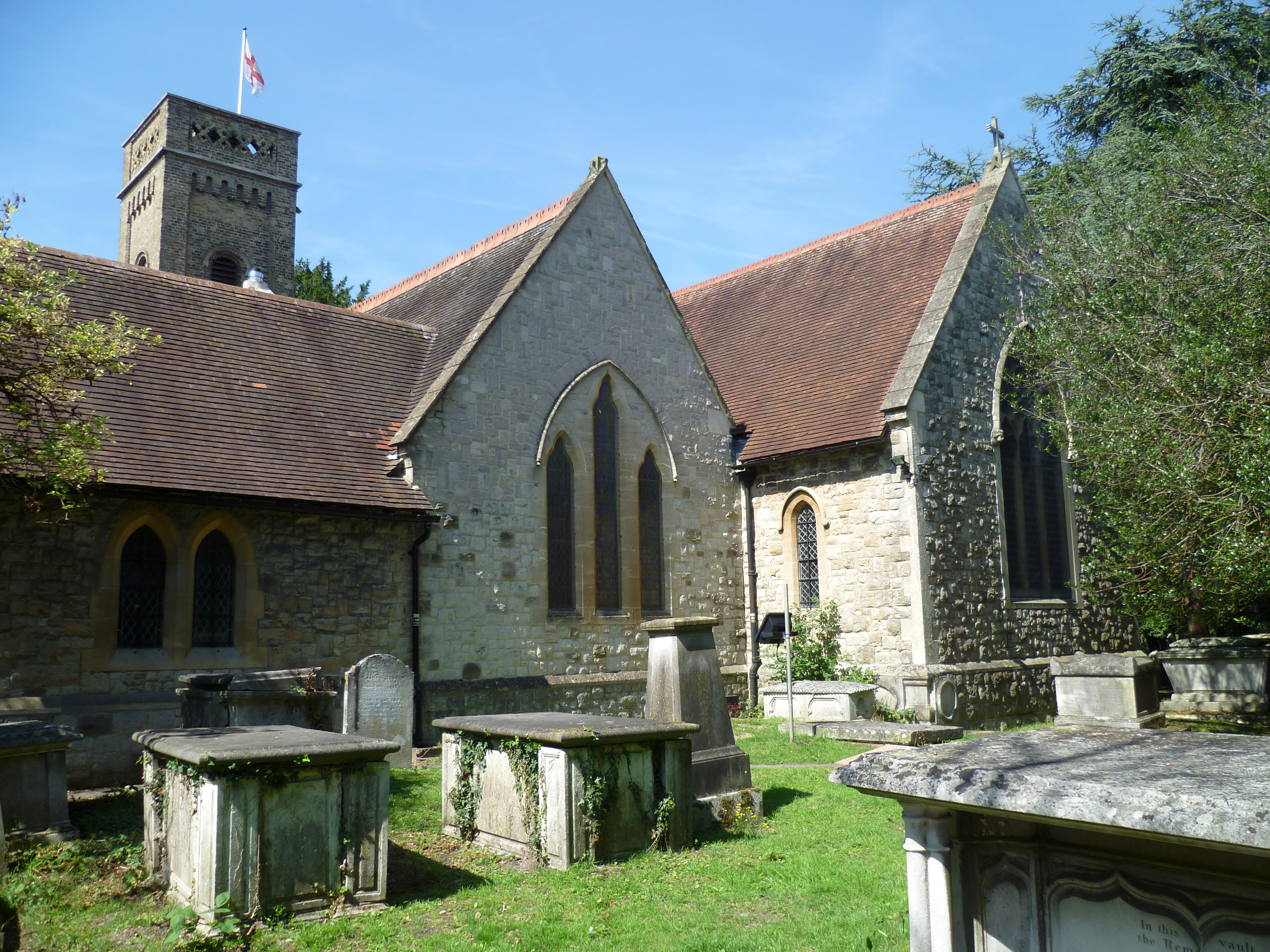
St Mary the Virgin, East Barnet, from the rear.

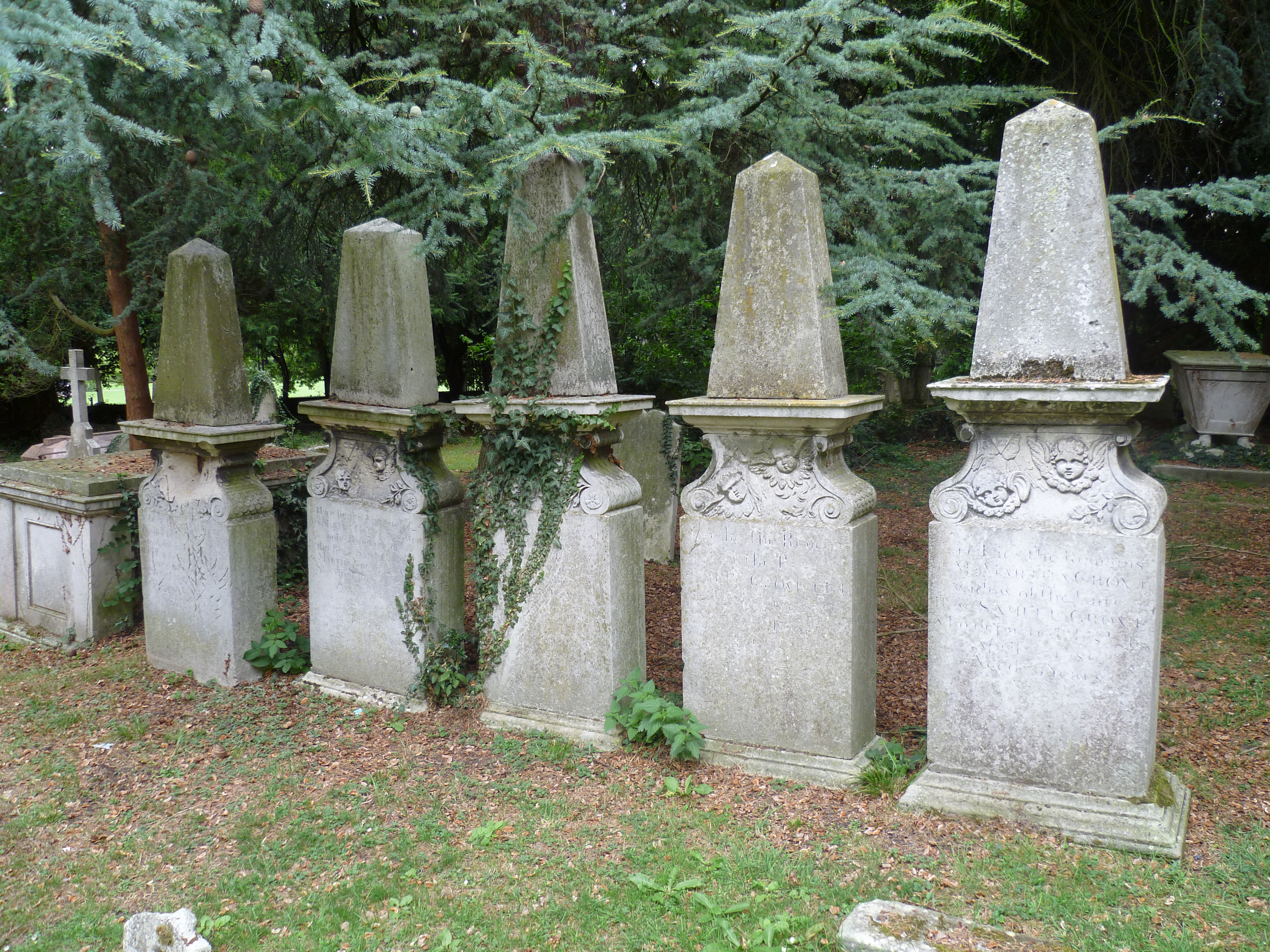
Grove family graves at St Mary the Virgin, East Barnet.

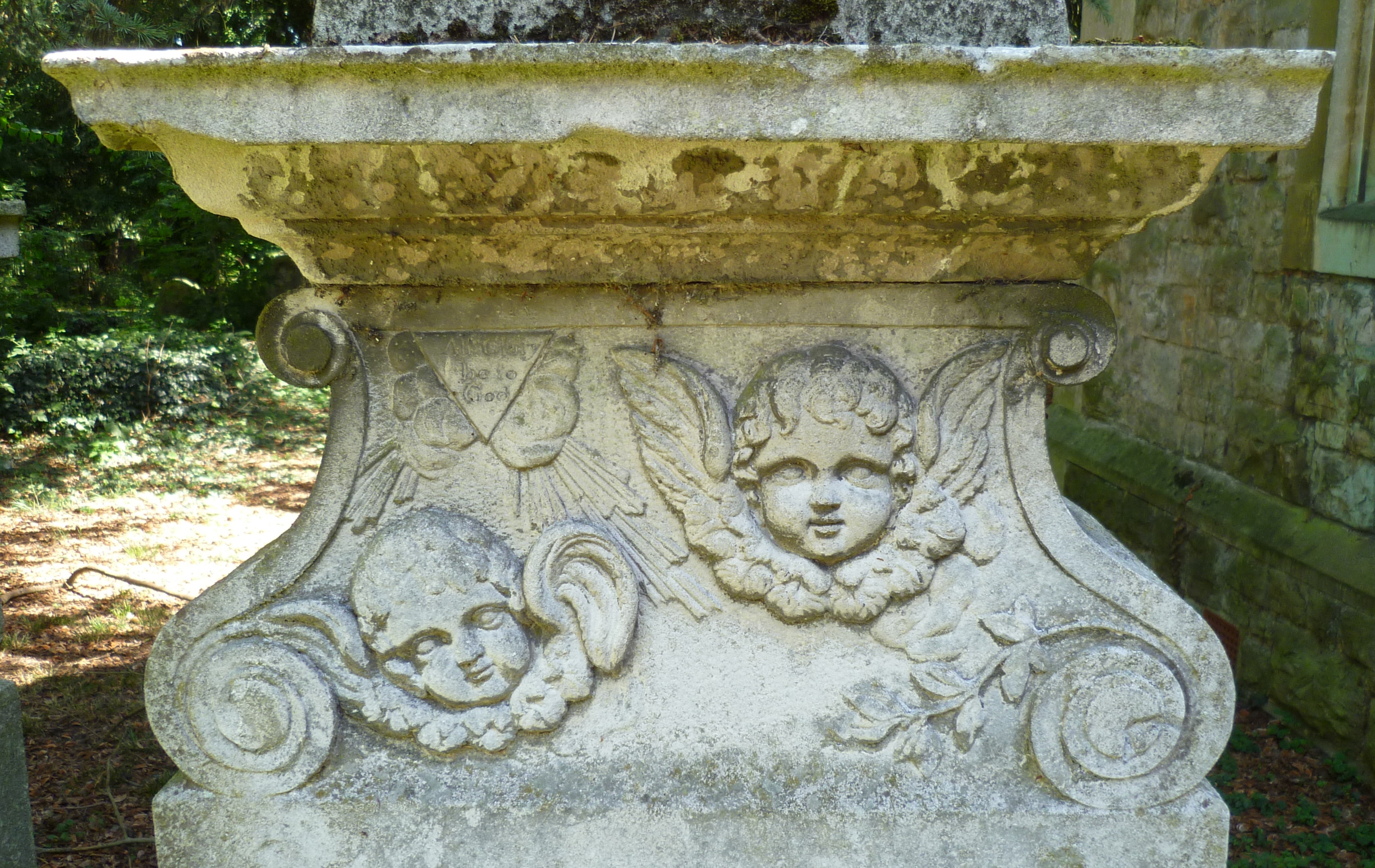
Cherubs on the grave of Samuel Grove's wife Martha (died 1789).

Samuel Grove (originally Groux) (c. 1698 – 18 or 19 February 1769) was rector of St Mary the Virgin church, East Barnet, London, from 1743 until the time of his death.

== Life ==
Grove was born around 1698, the son of a French Huguenot by the name of Groux who was forced to leave that country after the revocation of the Edict of Nantes in 1685. He became a sugar-refiner.

Grove was educated at Trinity College, University of Cambridge, from where he received the degree of LL.B. He became rector of St Mary's in 1743, replacing Daniel Cornelius de Beaufort (1700-1788), who was also a Protestant refugee.

Grove married Martha (died 4 April 1789, aged 79) and they had a daughter, also Martha, who died unmarried on 24 June 1794, aged 60.

== Death ==
Grove died on 18 or 19 February 1769. His will is available from the British National Archives. Grove was succeeded as rector by Benjamin Underwood.

== Grove graves ==
Grove is buried at St Mary's among a group of family graves that are grade II listed monuments with Historic England. Each has a similar cherub head ornament surmounted by an obelisk. The deaths span the years 1755 to 1861. The grave stones (from left to right in picture) and years of death are 1) Rev Dr Francis White 1755, 2) Miss Martha Grove 1794 and John Grove 1861, 3) John Grove 1819, Mrs Elizabeth Grove 1825, and Mrs Martha Jaques 1849, 4) Rev Samuel Grove 1769, 5) Mrs Martha Grove 1789, 6) W.P. Ashurst 1773 (not pictured).
