= Francis Lestock Beaufort =

English judge in Calcutta (1815–79)

Francis Lestock Beaufort (1815–1879), was a judge in Calcutta and the author of the Digest of Criminal Law Procedure in Bengal (1850). He was a son of Sir Francis Beaufort.
