= Francis de Beaufort =

Count Francis de Beaufort (1661–1714) was an English-born Dutch mercenary. In 1710 became court chancellor to the prince of Lippe-Detmold. He served in the Dutch army.

== Family ==
De Beaufort married Louise Mary Brazy, daughter of professor Etienne Brazy, and they had at least seven children who included the churchman Daniel Cornelius de Beaufort (1700–1788) and the scholar Louis de Beaufort (1703–1795), who was one of the first to raise doubts about the credibility of early Roman history.

The family were of Huguenot origins and were forced to flee France for the United Provinces after 1685.
