= Frances Anne Edgeworth =

Irish artist (1769–1865)

- Born: Frances Anne Beaufort; 1769; Navan, County Meath, Ireland
- Died: 10 February 1865 (aged 95–96); Edgeworthstown, County Longford, Ireland
- Other name: Fanny Edgeworth
- Occupations: Artist; Memoirist
- Known for: Botanical painting
- Parents: Daniel Augustus Beaufort; Mary Waller
- Relatives: Michael Pakenham Edgeworth; Francis Ysidro Edgeworth; Harriet Henrietta Beaufort; Louisa Beaufort; Maria Edgeworth; Francis Beaufort

Frances "Fanny" Anne Edgeworth (née Beaufort) (1769–1865) was an Irish botanical artist and memoirist. She was the stepmother and confidant of the author Maria Edgeworth.

== Early life ==
Frances Anne Beaufort was born at Flower Hill in Navan, County Meath, in 1769. She was one of four children of Daniel Augustus Beaufort and Mary Beaufort (née Waller). Her brother was Admiral Francis Beaufort, and her sisters were the writers Harriet and Louisa. She was educated at Mrs Terson's School at Portarlington, learning writing, drawing, dancing and French. She studied art further under the English artist Bowring, Dublin-based Francis Robert West, and Raymond Deshouilleres of London. In 1788, she accompanied her father on a tour of Ireland, recording archaeological sites and objects. The family lived in London from 1789 to 1790.

== Later life ==
On 31 May 1798, she married Richard Lovell Edgeworth, becoming his fourth wife and stepmother of Maria Edgeworth and her 11 siblings. Edgeworth and Maria, who was a year older than her stepmother, would become close to Maria, describing her as "her beloved friend and mother". There is evidence that Edgeworth was a writer like her sisters and stepdaughter, but her work was largely overlooked. A visitor to Edgeworthstown in 1813, James Hall, makes reference to her as a "successful" author, with a published novel, What You Choose to Call it or The Good Wife. This attribution was repeated in 1884, but is not mentioned by the family or their papers. It is known that Edgeworth wrote a memoir of Maria Edgeworth, containing selected letters. Some of Edgeworth's letters are held by the National Library of Ireland, and in the Bodleian Library.

The Edgeworths went on to have six children together: Frances Maria Edgeworth (1799 – 4 February 1848), Harriet Edgeworth (1801–1889), Sophia Edgeworth (1803–1836), Lucy Jane Edgeworth (1805–1897), Francis Beaufort Edgeworth (1809–1846), and Michael Pakenham Edgeworth (24 May 1812 – 1881). Edgeworth died on 10 February 1865 at Edgeworthstown, County Longford. Amongst her grandchildren is the philosopher and political economist, Francis Ysidro Edgeworth.

== Artistic work ==
Edgeworth was a contemporary of other botanical women artists of the time, such as Mary Delaney. Her father's biographer, Ellison, describes her as "an exceptionally talented artist in oils and crayons", though Edgeworth also worked in watercolour. She illustrated her father's 1792 A New Map of Ireland.

After her marriage, Edgeworth helped in the illustration of her husband's engineering projects. She produced illustrations for Maria Edgeworth's The Parent's Assistant, which were used in the third edition. It was the production of these drawings that led to Richard Lovell Edgeworth and Frances meeting and subsequently marrying. The private collection at Edgeworthstown House holds an album containing some of these drawings. The Huntington Library in California has a volume of her botanical watercolours of plants from her home and around Ireland, dating from 1798 to 1807. These botanical paintings are of well-known plants from her home and surroundings and consist of 101 drawings. The drawings are very detailed and show a keen interest in botany. Edgeworth includes the Linnaean names, with her primary interest being in a complex group of plants, the Cryptogams.
