= Michael Pakenham Edgeworth =

Irish botanist

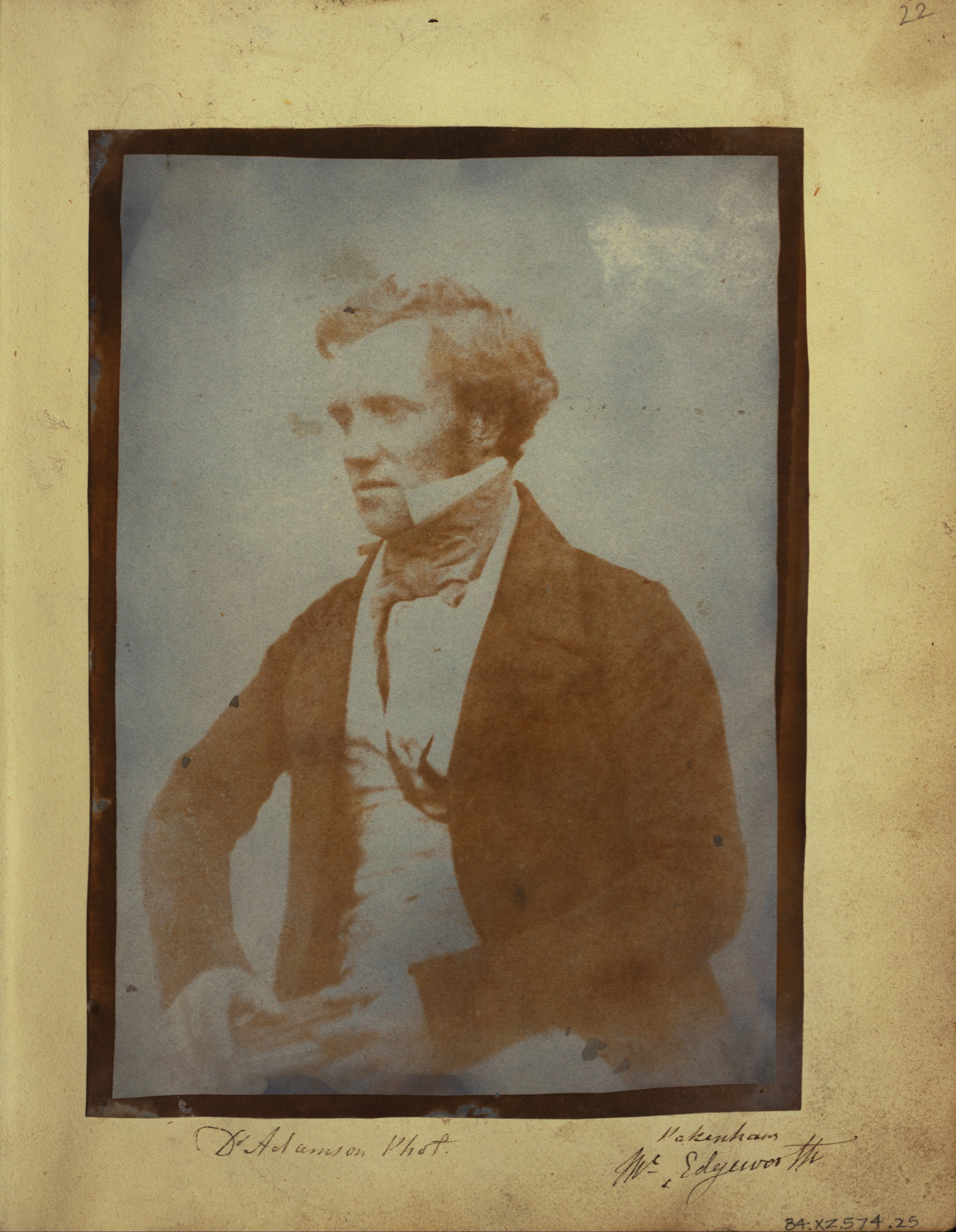
- Edgeworth c. 1843–1845
- Born: 24 May 1812; Mostrim, County Longford, Ireland
- Died: 30 July 1881 (aged 69); Eigg Island, Scottish Inner Hebrides, Scotland
- Citizenship: Irish
- Education: University of Edinburgh
- Partners: Christina (née Macpherson)
- Scientific career
- Fields: botany
- Author abbrev. (botany): Edgew.

Michael Pakenham Edgeworth (24 May 1812 – 30 July 1881) was an Irish botanist who specialized in seed plants and ferns, and spent most of his life working in India. He was also a pioneer of photography.

== Early life and family relations ==
Edgeworth was born in Edgesworthstown, County Longford, Ireland on 24 May 1812, one of twenty-four children of Richard Lovell Edgeworth (1744–1817) and his four wives. His mother, Frances Beaufort, was the fourth wife. His older half-sister Maria Edgeworth, born to his father's first wife Anna Maria Edgeworth (née Elers), became a novelist. Among his other siblings were Honora (half-sister), Fanny (sister), Lucy (sister), and Francis (brother). With his wife Christina, whom he married in 1842, Michael had a daughter named Harriet and a second, Christina, who died in infancy.

== Education ==
He attended Charterhouse School in England from September 1823 where his schoolmates included William Makepeace Thackeray and H.G. Liddell. He later studied oriental languages and botany at University of Edinburgh, Scotland, from 1827. A relative, Lord Carrington offered his mother a cadetship for one of her sons. From 1829 - 30 he was at the East India College, Haileybury, ending with appointment to the East India Company on 30 April 1831 as a writer.

== Travels ==
Although he is known to have had an estate of 1,659 acres (671 ha) in County Longford, Ireland, he joined the Bengal Civil Service of the British Colonial regime in India. He was initially based at Ambala, Muzaffarnagar, then Saharanpur and finally Banda until 1850 in a series of judicial and administrative posts covering an area from Lahore to Madras. Being possessed of a curious spirit, Edgeworth travelled widely especially in northern India where he collected plants and made notes. In June 1849 he was appointed as one of the Commissioners in The Punjab. In addition to his interest in botany, he also wrote about Indian languages, culture, topography, and antiquities.

But he was not always in India; he maintained a connection with scientific societies, being elected to the Linnean Society in 1842. On a return voyage to India in 1846 he took advantage of a short stop at Aden to collect plants. Of the 40 specimens, eleven turned out to be previously undescribed species that he reported in a scientific journal. A letter from Charles Darwin to J.D. Hooker mentions a conversation held between himself, Edgeworth and biologists John Lubbock and George Charles Wallich, at a meeting of the Linnean Society of London (18 April 1861) less than two years after the publication of Darwin's On the Origin of Species (22 November 1859). Unfortunately, very little of the content of this conversation is revealed in the letter.

Edgeworth experimented with the use of photographic techniques in botany from 1839, making daguerreotypes and photogenic drawings, some of which survive.

== Death ==
He retired in 1859, returning to London. Edgeworth died suddenly on 30 July 1881 on the island of Eigg, in the Scottish Inner Hebrides. Edgeworth was married to Christina daughter of Dr Macpherson of King's College, Aberdeen in 1846.

== Published works ==
He published thirteen papers on botany, climatology and his travels. In the field of botany, Edgeworth wrote:

- Descriptions of Some Unpublished Species of Plants from North-Western India (R.Taylor, 1851)
- Catalogue of Plants found in the Banda district, 1847–49, pp. 60.8 (Journal of the Asiatic Society of Bengal, Calcutta 1852, Vol. xxi.)
- Pollen (Hardwicke + Bogue, 1877)

His meticulous diaries from the years 1828 (just a few years before going to India) to 1867, was compiled in the weighty, 8,000-page publication entitled India in the Age of Empire - The Journals of Michael Pakenham Edgeworth (1812–1881). It chronicles the broadening of British imperial influence in the Indian territories and is principally of cultural and political interest.

== Botanical names ==
The plant genus Edgeworthia was dedicated to him, and to his half-sister, the writer Maria Edgeworth. Numerous other plants including Primula edgeworthii, Rhododendron edgeworthii, Impatiens edgeworthii and Platanthera edgeworthii were named after him.
