= Beaufort cipher =

Polyalphabetic encryption system

The Beaufort cipher, created by Sir Francis Beaufort, is a substitution cipher similar to the Vigenère cipher, with a slightly modified enciphering mechanism and tableau. Its most famous application was in a rotor-based cipher machine, the Hagelin M-209. The Beaufort cipher is based on the Beaufort square which is essentially the same as a Vigenère square but in reverse order starting with the letter "Z" in the first row, where the first row and the last column serve the same purpose.

== Using the cipher ==
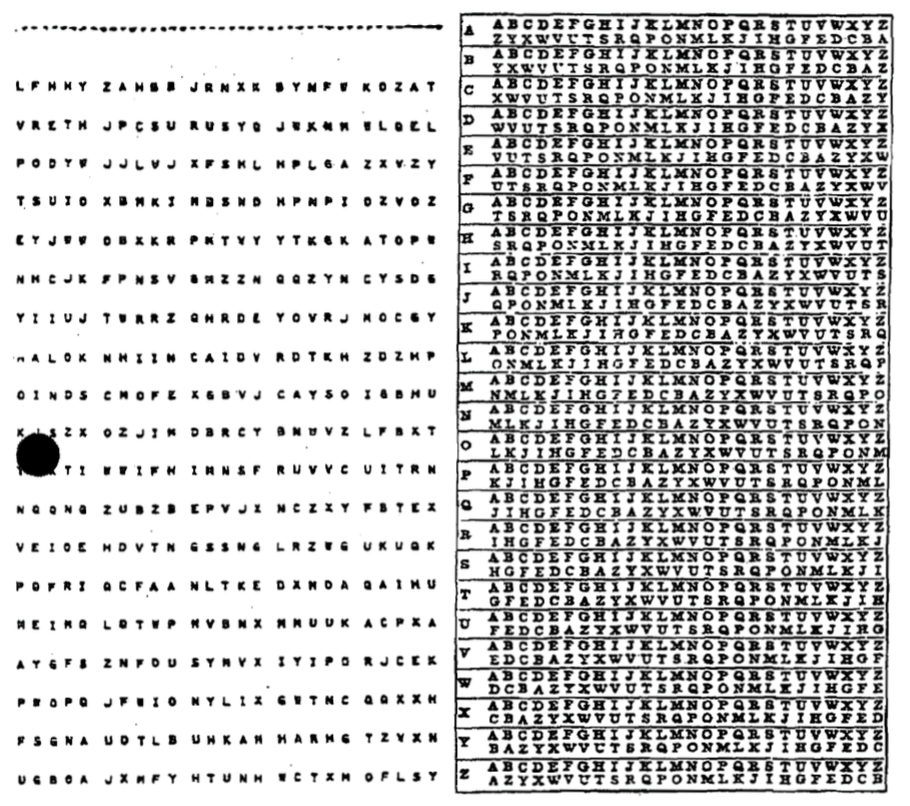
A format of one-time pad used by the U.S. National Security Agency, code named DIANA. The table on the right is an aid for converting between plaintext and ciphertext using the characters at left as the key.

To encrypt, first choose the plaintext character from the top row of the tableau; call this column P. Secondly, travel down column P to the corresponding key letter K. Finally, move directly left from the key letter to the left edge of the tableau, the ciphertext encryption of plaintext P with key K will be there.

For example if encrypting plain text character "d" with key "m" the steps would be:

1. find the column with "d" on the top,
2. travel down that column to find key "m",
3. travel to the left edge of the tableau to find the ciphertext letter ("K" in this case).

To decrypt, the process is reversed. Unlike the otherwise very similar Vigenère cipher, the Beaufort cipher is a reciprocal cipher, that is, decryption and encryption algorithms are the same. This obviously reduces errors in handling the table which makes it useful for encrypting larger volumes of messages by hand, for example in the manual DIANA crypto system, used by U.S. Special Forces during the Vietnam War (compare DIANA-table in the image).

In the above example in the column with "m" on top one would find in the reciprocal "d" row the ciphertext "K". The same is true for decryption where ciphertext "K" combined with key "m" results in plaintext "d" as well as combining "K" with "d" results in "m". This results in "trigram" combinations where two parts suffice to identify the third. After eliminating the identical trigrams only 126 of the initial 676 combinations remain (see below) and could be memorized in any order (e.g. AMN can be memorized as "man" and CIP as "pic") to speed up encoding and decoding.

AAZ ABY ACX ADW AEV AFU AGT AHS AIR AJQ AKP ALO AMN                                                     
    BBX BCW BDV BEU BFT BGS BHR BIQ BJP BKO BLN BMM                                                 BZZ 
        CCV CDU CET CFS CGR CHQ CIP CJO CKN CLM                                                 CYZ     
            DDT DES DFR DGQ DHP DIO DJN DKM DLL                                             DXZ DYY     
                EER EFQ EGP EHO EIN EJM EKL                                             EWZ EXY         
                    FFP FGO FHN FIM FJL FKK                                         FVZ FWY FXX         
                        GGN GHM GIL GJK                                         GUZ GVY GWX             
                            HHL HIK HJJ                                     HTZ HUY HVX HWW             
                                IIJ                                     ISZ ITY IUX IVW                 
                                                                    JRZ JSY JTX JUW JVV                 
                                                                KQZ KRY KSX KTW KUV                     
                                                            LPZ LQY LRX LSW LTV LUU                     
                                                        MOZ MPY MQX MRW MSV MTU                         
                                                    NNZ NOY NPX NQW NRV NSU NTT                         
                                                        OOX OPW OQV ORU OST                             
                                                            PPV PQU PRT PSS                             
                                                                QQT QRS                                 
                                                                    RRR                                 

== Algebraic description ==
The Beaufort cipher can be described algebraically. For example, using an encoding of the letters A–Z as the numbers 0–25 and using addition modulo 26, let $M = M_1 \dots M_n$ be the characters of the message, $C = C_1 \dots C_n$ be the characters of the cipher text and $K = K_1 \dots K_n$ be the characters of the key, repeated if necessary. Then Beaufort encryption $E$ can be written,

$$C_i = E_K(M_i) = (51-K_i-M_i) \mod {26}$$.

Similarly, decryption $D$ using the key $K$,

$$M_i = D_K(C_i) = (51-K_i-C_i) \mod {26}$$.

== Decrypting as a Vigenere cipher ==
Due to the similarities between the Beaufort cipher and the Vigenère cipher it is possible, after applying a transformation, to solve it as a Vigenère cipher. By replacing every letter in the ciphertext and key with its opposite letter (such that 'a' becomes 'z', 'b' becomes 'y' etc.; i.e. an Atbash-transformation) it can be solved like a Vigenère cipher.

== Distinguished from 'variant Beaufort' ==
The Beaufort cipher should not be confused with the "variant Beaufort" cipher. In variant Beaufort, encryption is performed by performing the decryption step of the standard Vigenère cipher, and likewise decryption is performed by using Vigenère encryption.
