= Beaufort County Schools =

Beaufort County Schools could refer to one of the following:

- Beaufort County Schools (North Carolina) – Beaufort County, North Carolina
- Beaufort County Schools (South Carolina) – Beaufort County, South Carolina
