= Daniel Cornelius de Beaufort =

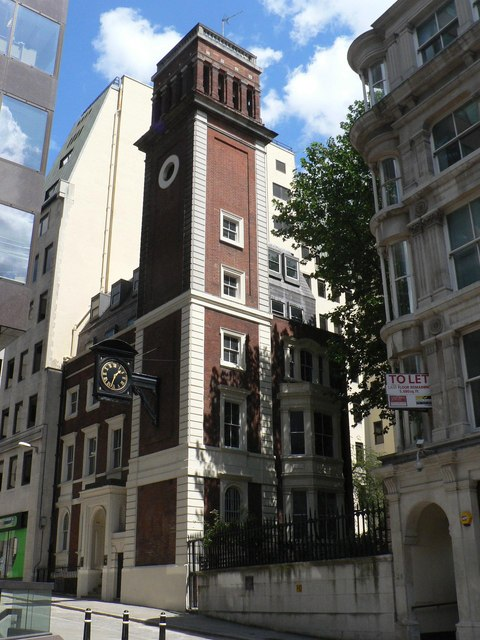
St. Martin Orgar

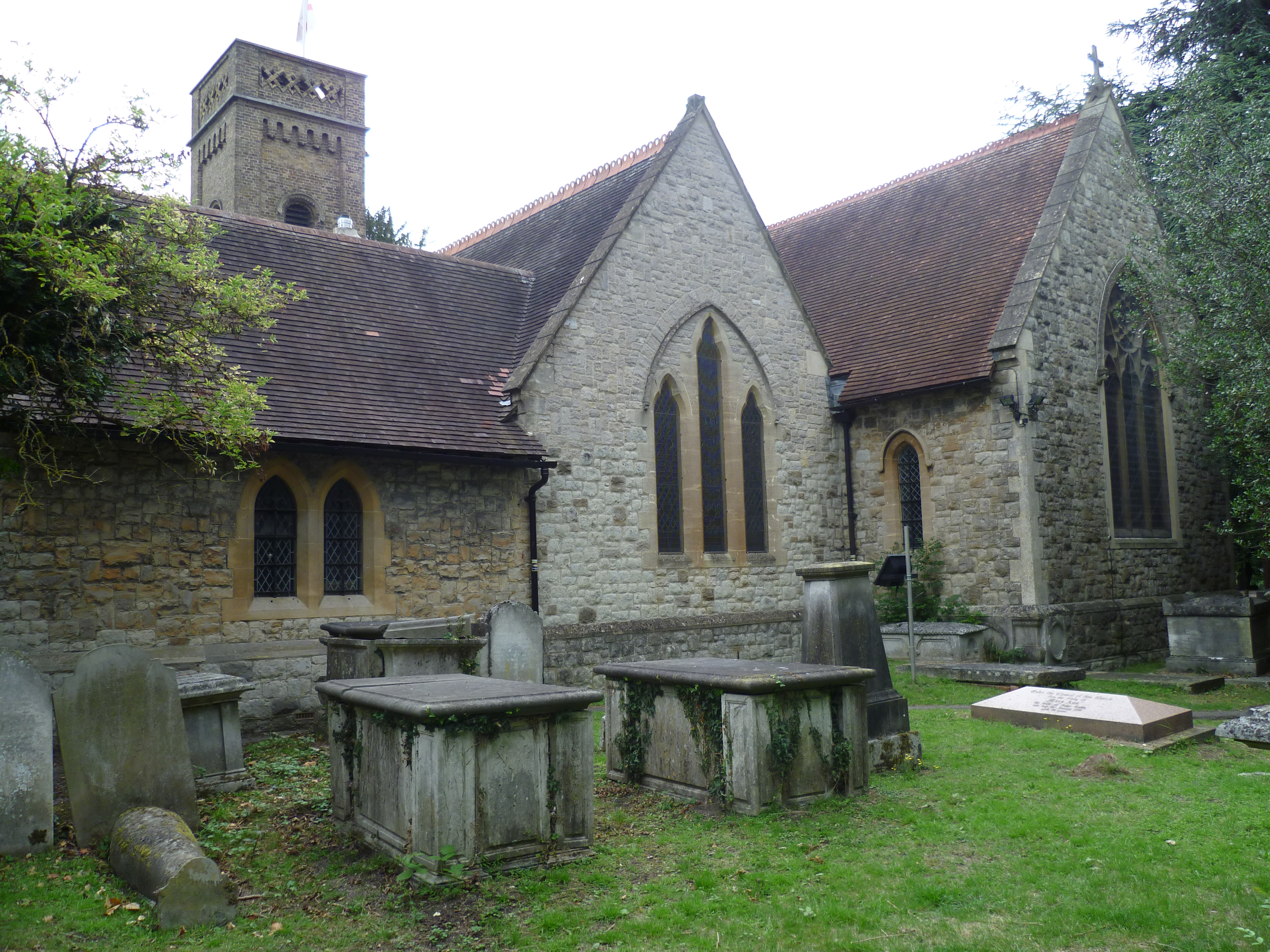
St Mary the Virgin, East Barnet from the rear.

Daniel Cornelius de Beaufort (1700–1788) was rector of St Mary the Virgin church, East Barnet, London, and later Provost of Tuam and rector of Clonenagh in Ireland.

== Early life ==
De Beaufort was born in Wessel, Westphalia in 1700. He was the seventh child of Count Francis de Beaufort, court chancellor to the Prince of Lippe-Detmold and his wife, Louise Mary Brazy. The family were of Huguenot origin and were forced to flee France for the United Provinces after 1685. His brother, Louis de Beaufort (1703–1795), was a scholar who was one of the first to raise doubts about the credibility of early Roman history.

De Beaufort was educated at the University of Utrecht and ordained as a priest.

== Clerical career ==
De Beaufort moved to England where he ministered to the French Huguenot community and was ordained into the Church of England. He was appointed to the living of St Martin Orgar in the City of London, where French Protestants then worshipped, and officiated at the Savoy Chapel. He became rector of St Mary the Virgin church, East Barnet, in 1739, which from 1741 he combined with his duties at the Little Savoy. He left East Barnet in 1743 and was succeeded by Samuel Grove.

== Family ==
De Beaufort married Esther Gougeon whose sister Denise was the mother of Sir William Neville Hart. They had a son Daniel Augustus Beaufort (1739–1821) who was a priest and distinguished cartographer. His son was Sir Francis Beaufort (1774-1857), Royal Navy officer and hydrographer and the inventor of the Beaufort Scale for indicating wind force.

== Ireland ==
In 1746, de Beaufort accompanied the Earl of Harrington to Ireland as chaplain and in 1747 he received the benefice of Navan, Meath. In 1753 he was appointed to be Provost of Tuam and he later became rector of Clonenagh.

== Selected publications ==
- A Short Account of the Doctrines and Practices of the Church of Rome. 1788
