= Daniel Augustus Beaufort =

British Anglican priest and geographer

- Born: 1 October 1739; East Barnet, United Kingdom
- Died: 1821 (aged 81–82); Collon, County Louth, Ireland
- Education: Trinity College Dublin
- Occupations: Geographer; Priest; Architect
- Spouse: Mary Waller (m. 1770–1821)
- Children: William Louis Beaufort; Frances Anne Edgeworth; Harriet Henrietta Beaufort; Francis Beaufort; Louisa Beaufort
- Parents: Daniel Cornelius de Beaufort; Esther Gougeon

Daniel Augustus Beaufort LL.D. (1 October 1739 – 1821), was an Anglican priest and geographer, born in England to French Huguenot parents. He was rector of Navan, County Meath, Ireland, from 1765 to 1818, and a talented amateur architect also remembered for his 1792 map of Ireland.

== Parentage and family ==
Beaufort's father, Daniel Cornelius de Beaufort (1700–1788), was a French Huguenot refugee, who became pastor of the Huguenot church in Spitalfields, London in 1728, and of that in Parliament Street, Bishopsgate, in 1729. He entered the Church of England in 1731. He married Esther Gougeon in London on 11 June 1738, and was rector of East Barnet from 1739 to 1743. Esther was the sister of Denise Gougeon, the mother of Sir William Neville Hart.

Taking his family with him to accompany Lord Harrington to Ireland, de Beaufort became rector of Navan in 1747. He was provost and archdeacon of Tuam from 1753 to 1758. He was rector of Clonenagh from 1758 until his death thirty years later. In 1788, he published A Short Account of the Doctrines and Practices of the Church of Rome, divested of all Controversy. In 1738 his brother, Louis de Beaufort, published a work on the uncertainty of Roman history.

== Education and calling ==
Daniel Augustus was educated at Trinity College, Dublin, of which he was elected a scholar in 1757. He became B.A. in 1759, M.A. in 1764, and LL.D. (honoris causa) in 1789. He was ordained by the Bishop of Salisbury, and, in succession to his father, was rector of Navan, County Meath, from 1765 to 1818.

In 1790 he was presented by the Right Hon. John Foster to the vicarage of Collon, County Louth. He afterwards built the church at Collon, where he remained until his death in 1821. He was successively collated to the prebendal stalls of Kilconnell, in the diocese of Clonfert, (3 October 1818), and of Mayne, in the diocese of Ossory (20 April 1820).

== Life ==
Beaufort's 1797 civil and ecclesiastical map of Ireland

Beaufort took a prominent part in the foundation of Sunday schools, and in the preparation of elementary educational works. He helped found the Royal Irish Academy. His most important work was his 1792 ecclesiastical map of Ireland, regarded as a masterpiece of careful scholarship. He accompanied it by a memoir of the civil and ecclesiastical state of the country. All the places marked on the map are systematically indexed in the memoir and assigned to their respective parishes, baronies, etc. In the preface, the author stated his map was prepared from original observations to remedy the defects of existing maps of Ireland. Competent authorities pronounced it and the memoir to be valuable contributions to geography. The publication of this work was encouraged by the Marquis of Buckingham, lord-lieutenant of Ireland.

As well as being the architect of Collon Church, he is also responsible for the design for a new church at Ardbraccan, County Meath.

== Family ==
Beaufort married Mary, daughter and co-heiress of William Waller, of Allenstown, County Meath. Their elder son, William Louis Beaufort (1771–1849), was rector of Glanmire, and prebendary of Rathcooney, Cork, from 1814 until his death in 1849. They had three daughters: Frances, Harriet and Louisa. Their younger son was Francis Beaufort, who joined the Royal Navy and became a hydrographer; he received the Order of the Bath. (Note: Information from W. M. Beaufort, Esquire) (Note: Times, 18 June 1821) (Note: Gentlemen's Magazine vol ix.) (Note: Cotton's Fasti Hibernici) (Note: Monthly Review,' xiii. 173) (Note: Webb's Compendium of Irish Biography.) Daughter Frances was the fourth wife of Richard Lovell Edgeworth. Her step-daughter Honora married Frances' brother, Sir Francis Beaufort.
