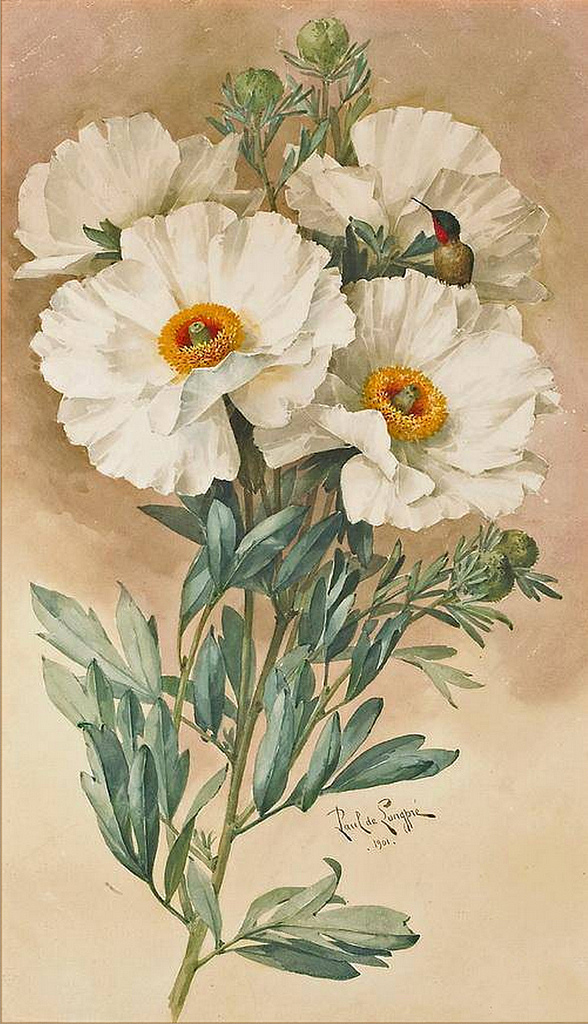

Scientific classification
- Kingdom: Plantae
- Clade: Tracheophytes
- Clade: Angiosperms
- Clade: Eudicots
- Order: Ranunculales
- Family: Papaveraceae
- Genus: Romneya
- Species: R. coulteri

Binomial name
- Romneya coulteri Harv.

= Romneya coulteri =

Species of flowering plant in the poppy family Papaveraceae

Romneya coulteri, the Coulter's Matilija poppy or California tree poppy, is a perennial species of flowering plant in the poppy family (Papaveraceae). Native to southern California, USA, and Baja California, Mexico, it grows in dry canyons in chaparral and coastal sage scrub plant communities, sometimes in areas recently burned. It is a popular ornamental plant, kept for its large, showy flowers.

The specific epithet coulteri commemorates Thomas Coulter, an Irish botanist and explorer.

This herbaceous perennial may exceed 2 m (7 ft) in height, its stem growing from a network of rhizomes. The gray-green, waxy-textured leaves are each divided into a few lance-shaped lobes, the blades growing up to 20 cm (7.9 in) long. The inflorescence is a large, solitary flower with three sepals and six crinkly white petals each up to 10 cm (4 in) long and almost as wide, for a total width of up to 20 cm (7.9 in), the largest of any California wildflower. At the center of the flower is a cluster of many yellow stamens. The fruit is a bristly capsule, 3–4 cm (1–2 in) long, containing many tiny seeds.

This plant often grows aggressively once planted. It spreads clonally by underground rhizomes and can appear a meter or more away from the original plant.

This plant bears the largest flowers of any species native to California, rivaled only by Hibiscus lasiocarpos. It was nominated for the honor of California state flower in 1890, but the California poppy won the title in a landslide.

In cultivation in the UK, Romneya coulteri and the cultivar 'White Cloud' have gained the Royal Horticultural Society's Award of Garden Merit.

== Chemical composition ==
Protopine is the major alkaloid of this plant, followed by coulteropine and romneine.

== Cytology ==
Bilquez found the chromosome number to be 2n= 38.

== Gallery ==
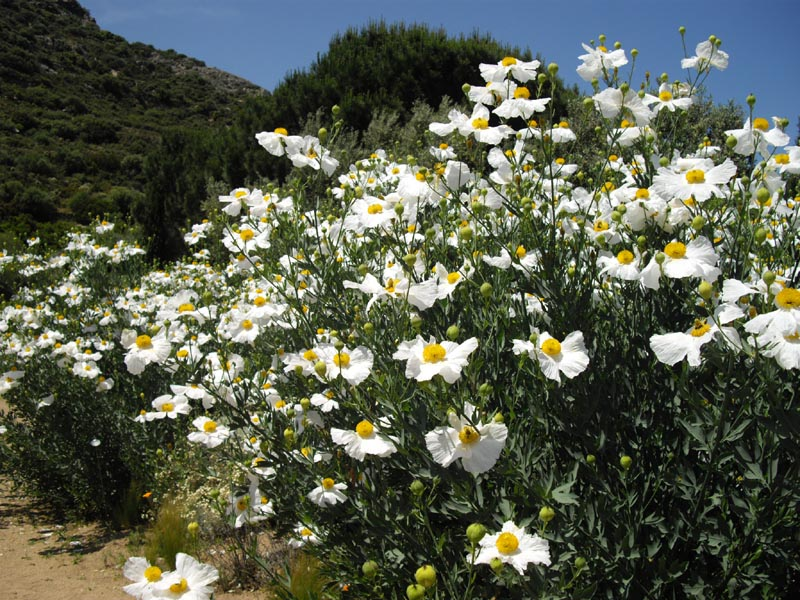

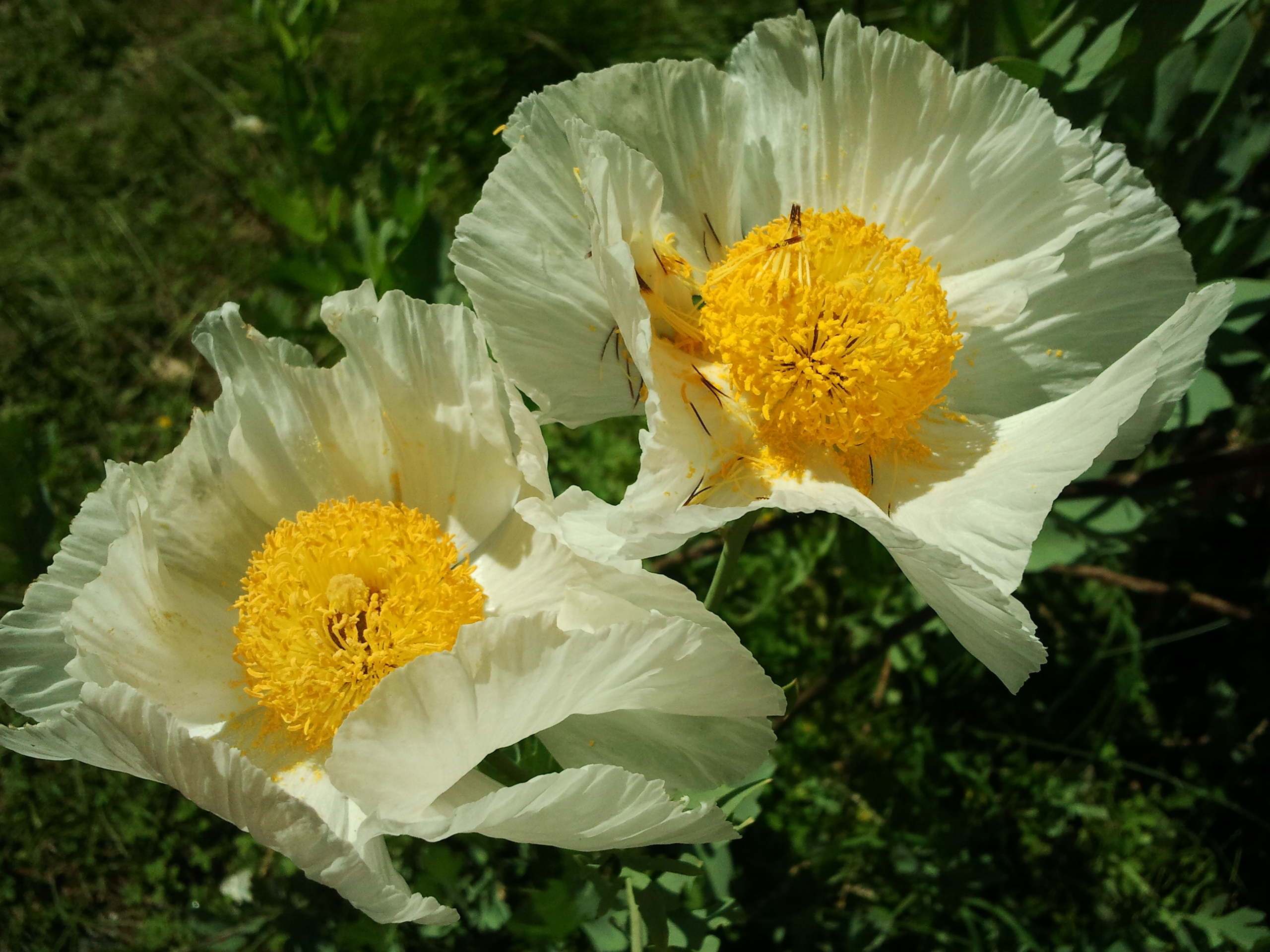
