= Richard Lovell Edgeworth =

Anglo-Irish politician, writer and inventor

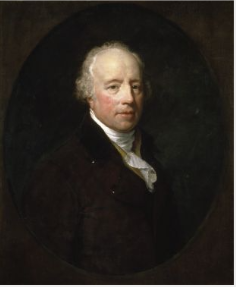
- c. 1800
- Born: 31 May 1744; Bath, England
- Died: 13 June 1817 (aged 73); Edgeworthstown, County Longford, Ireland
- Education: Corpus Christi College, Oxford; Trinity College, Dublin
- Spouses: Anna Maria Elers (1743–1773) m. 1763; Honora Sneyd (1751–1780) m. 1773; Elizabeth Sneyd (1753–1797) m. 1780; Frances Ann Beaufort (1769–1865) m. 1798
- Children: 22, including: Maria Edgeworth (1768–1849); William Edgeworth (1794–1829); Michael Pakenham Edgeworth (1812–1881)

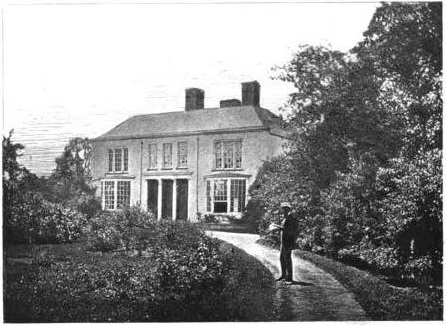
Edgeworthstown House, Ireland

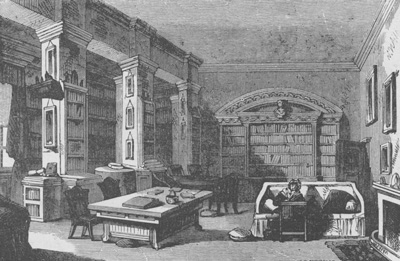
Library at Edgeworthstown House 1888

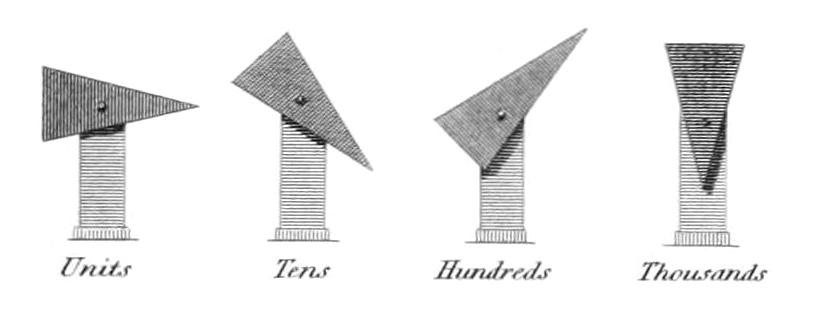
Edgeworth's proposed optical telegraph for use in Ireland. The rotational position of each one of the four indicators represented a number 1-7 (0 being "rest"), forming a four-digit number. The number stood for a particular word in a codebook.

Richard Lovell Edgeworth (31 May 1744 – 13 June 1817) was an Anglo-Irish politician, writer and inventor. He had 22 children.

== Biography ==
Edgeworth was born in Pierrepont Street, Bath, England, son of Richard Edgeworth senior, and great-grandson of Sir Salathiel Lovell through his mother, Jane Lovell, granddaughter of Sir Salathiel. The Edgeworth family came to Ireland in the 1580s. Richard was descended from Francis Edgeworth, appointed joint Clerk of the Crown and Hanaper in 1606, who inherited a fortune from his brother Edward Edgeworth, Bishop of Down and Connor.

A Trinity College, Dublin and Corpus Christi College, Oxford alumnus, he is credited for creating, among other inventions, a machine to measure the size of a plot of land. He also made strides in developing educational methods. He anticipated the caterpillar track with an invention that he played around with for forty years but that he never successfully developed. He described it as a "cart that carries its own road".

He was married four times, including to Honora Sneyd and to Frances Beaufort, older sister of Francis Beaufort of the Royal Navy. Edgeworth and Francis Beaufort installed a semaphore line for Ireland. Edgeworth was a member of the Lunar Society, an informal organisation of Birmingham-based industrialists, scientists and intellectuals that met regularly to discuss and share ideas relating to their fields of interest. Other members included Erasmus Darwin, Josiah Wedgwood and James Watt.

Richard Edgeworth and his family lived in Ireland at his estate at Edgeworthstown, County Longford, where he reclaimed bogs and improved roads. He sat in Grattan's Parliament for St Johnstown (County Longford) from 1798 until the Act of Union in 1801, and advocated Catholic Emancipation and parliamentary reform. He was a founder-member of the Royal Irish Academy. He died in Edgeworthstown on 13 June 1817.

== Family ==
He was the father of 22 children by his four wives

1. Anna Maria Elers (1743–1773), of whom five children
  Richard Edgeworth (1765–1796), m. Elizabeth Knight 1788. Died in America
  Lovell Edgeworth (1766–1766)
  Maria Edgeworth (1768–1849) the novelist
  Emmeline Edgeworth (1770–1817), married Dr. John King of Bristol, October 1802
  Anna Maria Edgeworth (1773–1824), married Dr. Thomas Beddoes 1794, child Thomas Lovell Beddoes (1803-1849).
2. Honora Sneyd (1751 – 1 May 1780), of whom two children
  Honora Edgeworth (1774–1790)
  Lovell Edgeworth (1775–1842), who inherited the property
3. Elizabeth Sneyd (1753–1797), sister of Honora Sneyd, of whom five sons and four daughters
  Elizabeth Edgeworth (1781–1805)
  Henry Edgeworth (1782–1813)
  Charlotte Edgeworth (1783–1807)
  Sophia Edgeworth (1784–1784)
  Charles Sneyd Edgeworth (1786–1864) m. Henrica Broadhurst 1813, succeeded his brother Lovell Edgeworth
  William Edgeworth (1788–1790)
  Thomas Day Edgeworth (1789–1792)
  Honora Edgeworth (1792–1858), married Francis Beaufort (his brother-in-law from his fourth marriage) in 1838
  William Edgeworth (1794–1829), engineer.
4. Frances Ann Beaufort (1769–1865), botanical artist, daughter of Daniel Augustus Beaufort and Mary Waller, of whom six children
  Frances Maria Edgeworth (1799–1848) m. Lestock Wilson 1829
  Harriet Edgeworth (1801–1889) m. Richard Butler 1826
  Sophia Edgeworth (1803–1836) m. Barry Fox 1824
  Lucy Jane (1805–1897), married the Irish astronomer Thomas Romney Robinson 1843.
  Francis Beaufort Edgeworth (1809–1846), Mentioned in Thomas Carlyle's Life of Sterling. Married Rosa Florentina Eroles of Spain.
  Michael Pakenham Edgeworth (1812–1881), m. Christina Macpherson 1846, botanist.

== Bibliography ==
- Butler, Marilyn (1972). Maria Edgeworth: A Literary Biography. Oxford University Press. ISBN 978-0198120179.
- Clarke, Desmond (1965). The ingenious Mr. Edgeworth. Oldbourne.
- Curtis, Stanley James; Boultwood, Myrtle E. A. (1977). A short history of educational ideas (5th ed.). University Tutorial Press. ISBN 9780723107675.
- Edgeworth, Maria (1820). "RL Edgeworth Esq". The Annual Register. Part II: 1215–1223.
- Priestman, Judith; Clapinson, Mary; Rogers, Tim (1993). "Catalogue of the papers of Maria Edgeworth (1768-1849), and the Edgeworth family, 17th-19th century". University of Oxford, Bodleian Library.
- Colvin, Christina Edgeworth. "Edgeworth, Richard Lovell (1744–1817)". Oxford Dictionary of National Biography (online ed.). Oxford University Press. doi:10.1093/ref:odnb/8478. (Subscription, Wikipedia Library access or UK public library membership required.)
- "The Four Wives of Richard Lovell Edgewort & The Children of Richard Lovell Edgeworth" (Images). English-Irish Edgeworths. House of Edgeworth, South Carolina.
- MacDonald, Edgar E. (1977). The Education of the Heart: The Correspondence of Rachel Mordecai Lazarus and Maria Edgeworth. UNC Press. ISBN 9781469606095.
- O'Connor, Maura (2010). The Development of Infant Education in Ireland, 1838-1948: Epochs and Eras. Bern: Lang. ISBN 9783034301428.
- "Edgeworth Papers. Collection List 40" (PDF). National Library of Ireland. p. 112.
- "Edgeworth Collection (Longford County Library)". Ask About Ireland.
- Beach Combing (21 July 2011). "Forgotten Anglo-Irish Inventor Anticipates the Modern Age". Beachcombing's Bizarre History Blog.

Parliament of Ireland
Preceded by Sir William Gleadowe-Newcomen, 1st Bt; Francis Hardy	Member of Parliament for St Johnstown (County Longford); 1798 – 1801; Served alongside: William Moore	Succeeded by Parliament of the United Kingdom
