= Louis de Beaufort =

French-Dutch historian (1703–1795)

Louis de Beaufort (6 October 1703 – 11 August 1795) was a French-Dutch historian best known for his critical approach to the history of Rome. His brother was Daniel Cornelius de Beaufort (1700-1788).

Born in The Hague to a French family of Huguenots, he lived in Utrecht and Leiden and worked as a personal tutor to the Prince of Hesse-Hombourg while at Leiden University (1739–42). In 1738 he published at Utrecht the Dissertation sur l'incertitude des cinq prèmiers siècles de l'histoire romaine (A Dissertation Upon the Uncertainty of the First Five Centuries of Roman History), in which he questioned the value of even the classical sources of the highest repute, such as Livy and Dionysius of Halicarnassus, for writing the history of the origins of ancient Rome, and pointed out by what methods and by the aid of what documents a truly scientific basis might be given to its history. While this was not an unprecedented argument, Beaufort made his case particularly forcefully and pushed against the traditional and less critical approaches adopted by esteemed historians of the time such as Charles Rollin. A German, Christopher Saxius, endeavoured to refute Beaufort's argument in a series of articles published in vols. i.-iii. of the Miscellanea Liviensia. Beaufort replied by some brief and ironic Remarques in the appendix to the second edition of his Dissertation (1750).

He was elected a Fellow of the Royal Society in October 1746 and would move to Maastricht where he died in 1795.

He also wrote an Histoire de Cesar Germanicus (Leiden, 1761), and La République romaine, ou plan general de l'ancien gouvernement de Rome (The Hague, 1766, 2 vols quarto).

Though not a scholar of the first rank, Beaufort has at least the merit of having been a pioneer in raising the question, afterwards elaborated by Niebuhr, as to the credibility of early Roman history and the importance of source criticism.
