= Francis Beaufort =

Irish hydrographer and naval officer (1774–1857)

Rear-Admiral Sir Francis Beaufort KCB FRS FRGS FRAS MRIA
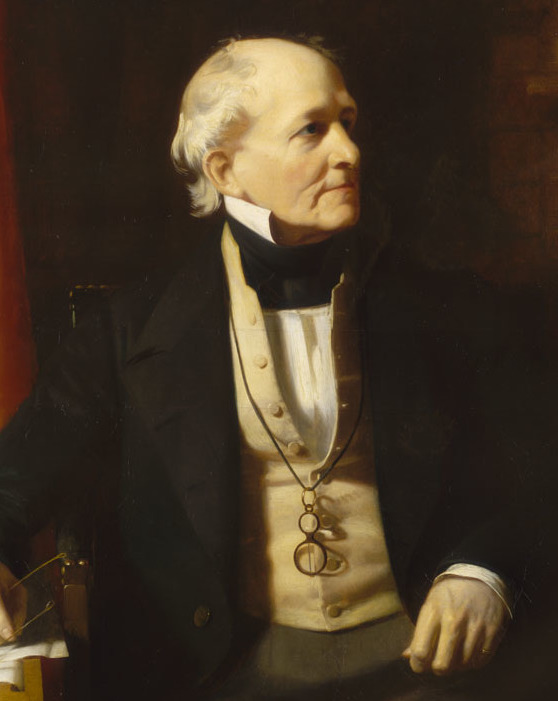
- Beaufort c. 1851

Hydrographer of the Navy
- In office 19 May 1829 – 25 January 1855
- Preceded by: Sir Edward Parry
- Succeeded by: John Washington

Personal details
- Born: 27 May 1774 Navan, County Meath, Ireland
- Died: 17 December 1857 (aged 83) Hove, Sussex, England
- Resting place: St John's Church Gardens
- Spouses: Alicia Wilson (1815–1834); Honora Edgeworth (1838–1857)
- Children: Francis Lestock Beaufort; Emily Anne Beaufort
- Parent: Daniel Augustus Beaufort
- Relatives: Frances Beaufort (sister); Henrietta Beaufort (sister); Daniel de Beaufort (grandfather)
- Occupation: Hydrographer, mariner
- Known for: Beaufort cipher, Beaufort scale
- Awards: Knight Commander of the Order of the Bath (1848)

Military service
- Branch: Royal Navy
- Service years: 1790–1855
- Rank: Rear-Admiral
- Wars: French Revolutionary Wars; Napoleonic Wars

Sir Francis Beaufort KCB FRS FRGS FRAS MRIA (/ˈboʊfərt/ BOH-fərt; 27 May 1774 – 17 December 1857) was an Irish hydrographer and naval officer who created the Beaufort cipher and the Beaufort scale.

== Early life ==
Francis Beaufort was descended from French Protestant Huguenots, who fled the French Wars of Religion in the sixteenth century. His parents moved to Ireland from London. His father, Daniel Augustus Beaufort, was a Protestant clergyman from Navan, County Meath, Ireland, and a member of the learned Royal Irish Academy. His mother Mary was the daughter and co-heiress of William Waller, of Allenstown House. Francis was born in Navan on 27 May 1774. He had an older brother, William Louis Beaufort and three sisters, Frances, Harriet, and Louisa. His father created and published a new map of Ireland in 1792. Francis grew up in Wales and Ireland until age fourteen. He left school and went to sea, but never stopped his education. By later in life, he had become sufficiently self-educated to associate with some of the greatest scientists and applied mathematicians of his time, including Mary Somerville, John Herschel, George Biddell Airy, and Charles Babbage.

Francis Beaufort had a lifelong awareness of the value of accurate charts for those travelling at sea, as he was shipwrecked at the age of fifteen due to a faulty chart. His most significant accomplishments were in nautical charting.

== Career ==
=== Early naval career ===
Beaufort first went to sea in 1789 on the British East India Company East Indiaman Vansittart. It was wrecked, but all but one man of its crew survived and Beaufort returned home.

Beaufort commenced his naval career in 1790 by joining HMS Latona as a midshipman. It was paid off late in the year and Beaufort transferred in 1791 to the fifth rate frigate HMS Aquilon. After the commencement of war with France he was on Aquilon during the Battle of the Glorious First of June off Ushant in Brittany in 1794, when Aquilon rescued the dismasted HMS Defence and exchanged broadsides with the French ship-of-the line, Impétueux.

He was promoted to Lieutenant on 10 May 1796 on HMS Phaeton. While serving on Phaeton, Beaufort was badly wounded leading a cutting-out operation off Málaga in 1800; the action resulted in the capture of the 14-gun polacca Calpe. Beaufort was promoted to the rank of Commander on 13 November 1800.

While recovering from his wounds, during which he received a "paltry" pension of £45 per annum, he helped his brother-in-law, Richard Lovell Edgeworth, to construct a semaphore line from Dublin to Galway. He spent two years at this activity, for which he would accept no remuneration.

=== Command ===
Beaufort returned to active service and was appointed a captain in the Royal Navy on 30 May 1810. Whereas other wartime officers sought leisurely pursuits, Beaufort spent his leisure time taking depth soundings and bearings, making astronomical observations to determine longitude and latitude, and measuring shorelines. His results were compiled in new charts.

The Admiralty gave Beaufort his first ship command, HMS Woolwich. He sailed it to the East Indies and escorted a convoy of East Indiamen back to Britain. The Admiralty then tasked him with conducting a hydrographic survey of the Rio de la Plata estuary in South America. Experts were very impressed by the survey Beaufort brought back. Notably, Alexander Dalrymple remarked in a note to the Admiralty in March 1808, that "We have few officers (indeed I do not know one) in our Service who have half his professional knowledge and ability, and in zeal and perseverance he cannot be excelled."

=== Anatolia ===
After the Woolwich, Beaufort received his first post-captain commission, commanding Frederickstein.

Throughout 1811–1812, Beaufort charted and explored southern Anatolia, a region he referred to as Karamania, locating many classical ruins, including Hadrian's Gate. An attack on the crew of his boat (at Ayas, near Adana), by Turks interrupted his work and he received a serious bullet wound in the hip. He returned to England and drew up his charts.

In 1817, he published his book Karamania; or a brief description of the South Coast of Asia Minor, and of the Remains of Antiquity.

=== Hydrographer of the Navy ===
In 1829, Beaufort was elected as a Fellow of the Royal Astronomical Society, and in the same year, at the age of 55 (retirement age for most administrative contemporaries), Beaufort was appointed as the British Admiralty Hydrographer of the Navy. He served in that post for 26 years, longer than any other Hydrographer. G.S. Ritchie, himself Hydrographer (1966–1971) described this period as the "High Noon" of Admiralty surveying. The geographical scope of surveying was greatly increased, both in home waters and overseas. The production of new charts increased from 19 in 1830 to 1230 in 1855.

In 1831, a Scientific Branch of the Admiralty was formed, which as well as the Hydrographic Department included the great astronomical observatories at Greenwich, England, and the Cape of Good Hope, Africa, and the Nautical Almanac and Chronometer Offices, and Beaufort was responsible for the administration. Beaufort directed some of the major maritime explorations and experiments of that period. He played a leading role in the search for the explorer, Sir John Franklin, who was lost during his last polar voyage to search for the Northwest Passage.

Beaufort was interested in scientific affairs beyond the confines of navigation. As a council member of the Royal Society, the Royal Observatory, and the Royal Geographical Society (which he helped found), Beaufort used his position and prestige as a top administrator to act as a "middleman" for many scientists of his time. Beaufort represented the geographers, astronomers, oceanographers, geodesists, and meteorologists to that government agency, the Hydrographic Office, which could support their research. In 1849 he assisted in the publication of the Admiralty Manual of Scientific Enquiry, to assist both Navy personnel and general travellers in scientific investigations, ranging from astronomy to ethnography.

Beaufort trained Robert FitzRoy, who was put in temporary command of the survey ship HMS Beagle after its previous captain committed suicide. When FitzRoy was reappointed as commander for what became the famous second voyage of the Beagle, he requested of Beaufort "that a well-educated and scientific gentleman be sought" as a companion on the voyage. Beaufort's enquiries led to an invitation to Charles Darwin, who later drew on his discoveries in formulating the theory of evolution he presented in his book The Origin of Species. Later, when Beaufort persuaded the Board of Trade to set up a Meterorological Department, Fitzroy became its first director

Using his many connections, including the Royal Society, Beaufort helped to obtain funding for the Antarctic voyage of 1839–1843 by James Clark Ross for extensive measurements of terrestrial magnetism, coordinated with similar measurements in Europe and Asia. (This is comparable to the International Geophysical Year of our time.)

Beaufort promoted the development of reliable tide tables around British shores, publishing the first edition of the Admiralty Tide Tables in 1833. This inspired similar research for Europe and North America. Aiding his friend William Whewell, Beaufort gained the support of the Prime Minister, Duke of Wellington, in expanding record-keeping at 200 British Coastguard stations. Beaufort gave enthusiastic support to his friend, Sir George Airy, the Astronomer Royal and noted mathematician, in achieving a historic period of measurements by the Greenwich and Good Hope observatories.

By the time Beaufort retired the Admiralty Chart series was a worldwide resource with 2,000 charts covering every sea.

=== Retirement ===
Beaufort retired from the Royal Navy with the rank of rear admiral on 1 October 1846, at the age of 72. He became "Sir Francis Beaufort" on being appointed KCB (Knight Commander of the Bath) on 29 April 1848, a relatively belated honorific considering the eminence of his position from 1829 onward. In 1840, he was elected to the American Philosophical Society.

== Personal life ==
Beaufort's extant correspondence of more than 200 letters and journals contained portions written in personal cipher. Beaufort altered the Vigenère cipher, by reversing the cipher alphabet, and the resulting variant is called the Beaufort cipher. The deciphered writings have revealed family and personal problems, including some of a sexual nature. It appears that between 1835 and his marriage to Honora Edgeworth in November 1838, he had incestuous relations with his sister Harriet. His diary entries, in cipher, show that he was tortured by guilt over this.

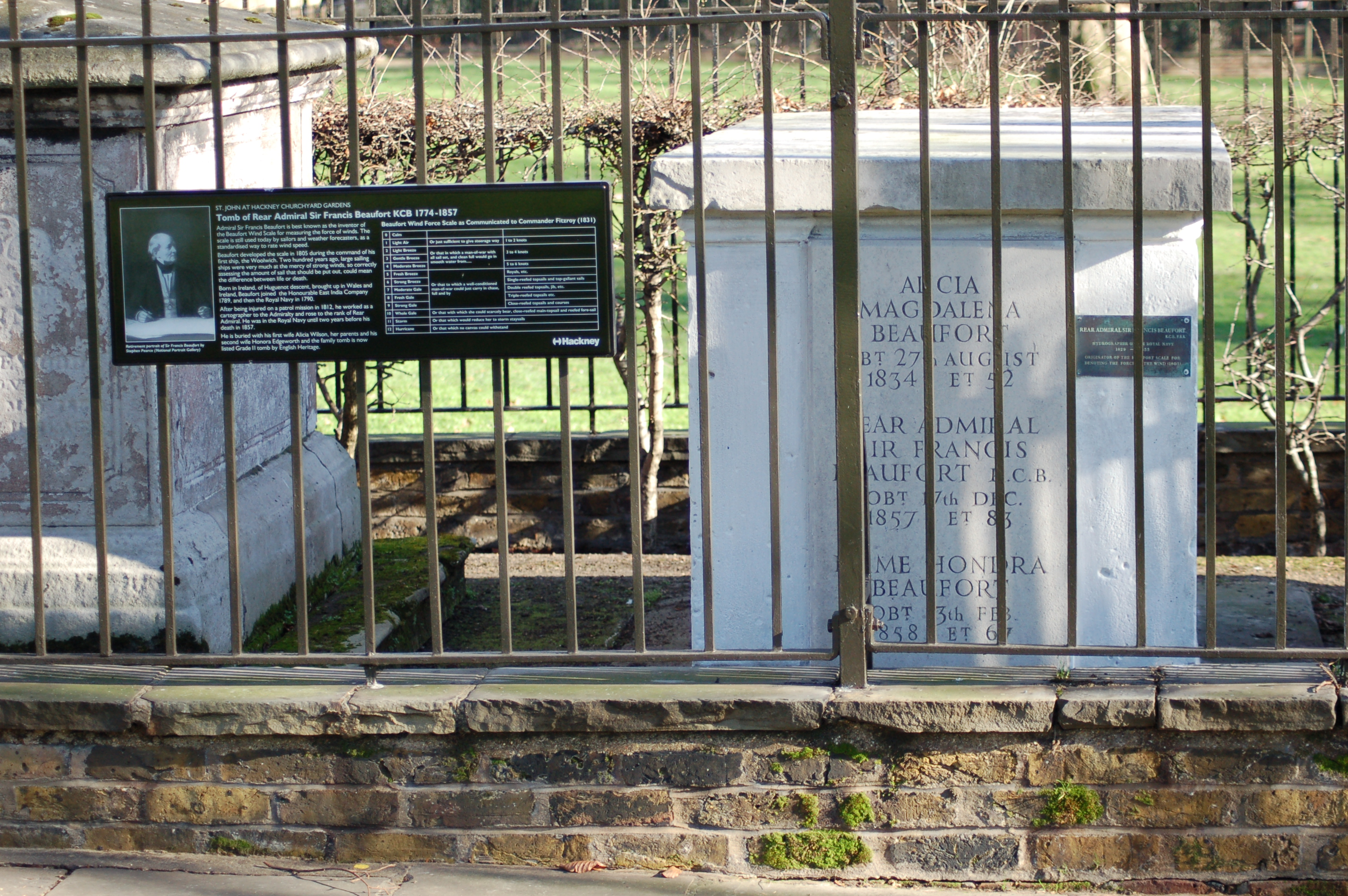
The Beaufort family tomb in St John's Church Gardens, London

He died on 17 December 1857, at age 83 in Hove, Sussex, England. He is buried in the church gardens of St John at Hackney, London, where his tomb may still be seen. His home in London, No. 52 Manchester Street, Westminster, is marked by an historic blue plaque noting his residency and achievements.

== Family ==
Beaufort married, firstly, Alicia Magdalena Wilson, daughter of Lestock Wilson R.N. under whom he had first served; she died in 1834. Of their children, three daughters and three sons were living in 1859. They included:

- Daniel Augustus Beaufort (1813/4–1898), cleric, married in 1851 Emily Nowell Davis, daughter of Sir John Francis Davis, 1st Baronet.
- Francis Lestock Beaufort (1815–1879), served in the Bengal civil service, from 1837 to 1876.
- Sophia Mary Bonne married the Rev. William Palmer in 1838.
- Emily Anne Smythe (1826–1887) was a hero of Bulgaria, a writer, illustrator and advocate of change in the training of nurses.

Beaufort married again in 1838, to Honora Edgeworth, the daughter of his brother-in-law Richard Lovell Edgeworth and his second wife. (Francis' sister Frances Beaufort had married Edgeworth as his fourth wife years earlier in the 1810s.)

== Legacy ==
=== Wind force scale ===
During these early years of command, Beaufort developed the first versions of his Wind Force Scale and Weather Notation coding, which he was to use in his journals for the remainder of his life. From the circle representing a weather station, a staff (rather like the stem of a note in musical notation) extends, with one or more half or whole barbs. For example, a stave with 3 1/2 barbs represents Beaufort seven on the scale, decoded as 32–38 mph, or a "moderate Gale".

=== Geographical legacy ===
Beaufort, like other patrons of exploration, has had his name given to many geographical places. Among these:

- Beaufort Sea (arm of Arctic Ocean)
- Beaufort's Dyke, North Channel
- Beaufort Island, Antarctic
- Beaufort an Australian town.

=== Cryptographic legacy ===
Beaufort created the Beaufort cipher. It is a substitution cipher similar to the Vigenère cipher.
