= Thomas Coulter =

Irish physician, botanist and explorer

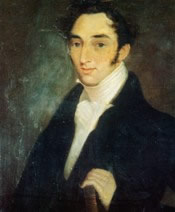
Thomas Coulter

Thomas Coulter (1793–1843), of Dundalk, was an Irish physician, botanist and explorer. He was a member of the Royal Irish Academy, a fellow of Trinity College, Dublin, and founder of that college's herbarium.

After completing a medical degree in Dublin, Coulter studied botany in Geneva for 17 months under Swiss taxonomist Augustin de Candolle. He then left Switzerland and became a physician with the Real del Monte Company in Mexico. During this period he collected and catalogued plants in the region. He eventually left Mexico and travelled the world exploring many countries and conducting botanical research culminating in Arizona and Alta California in the early 19th century. He returned to Ireland in 1834 and became the founding curator of the herbarium at Trinity College, Dublin. Though he was a physician by profession, Coulter achieved success in different fields and is best remembered as an explorer and a pioneer in botany.

Plants he discovered and that were named after him include:

- Pinus coulteri
- Romneya coulteri
