= Giovan Battista Bellaso =

16th-century Italian cryptologist

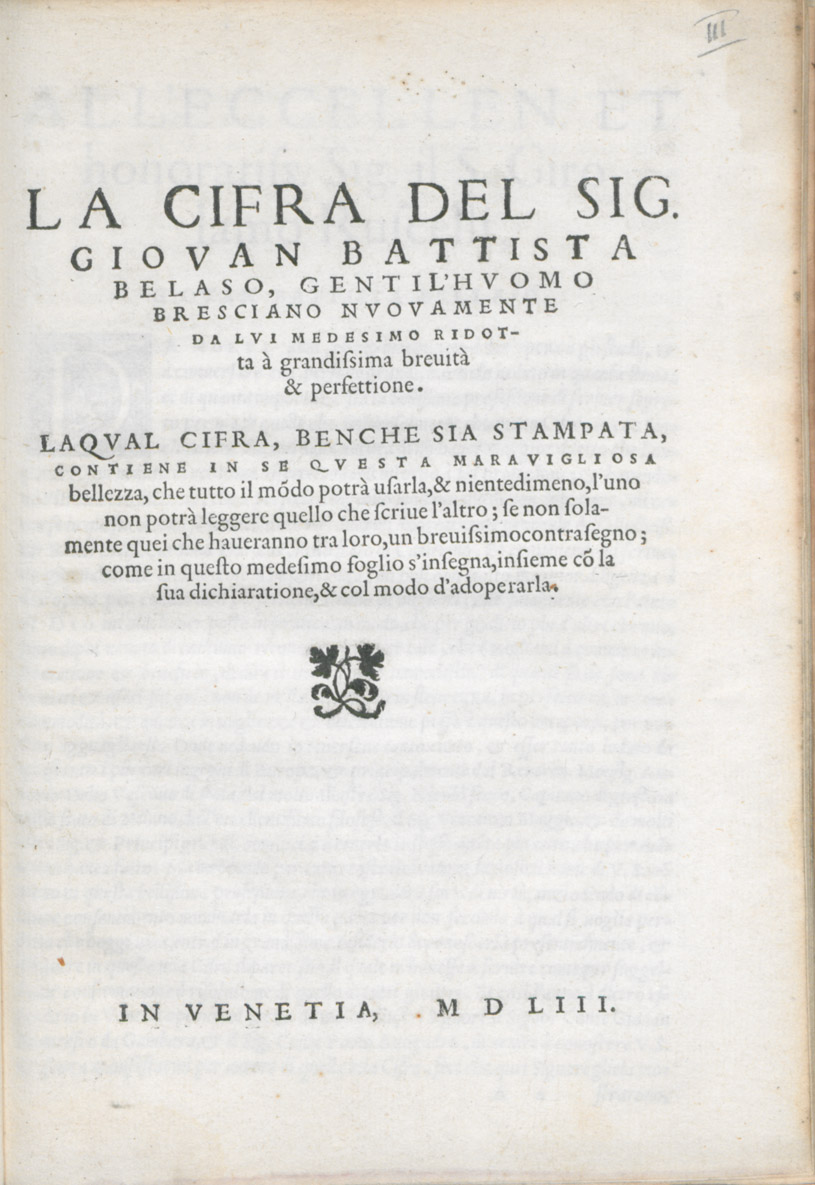
La cifra ("The Cipher"), 1553

Giovan Battista Bellaso (1505 – between 1568 and 1581) was an Italian cryptologist, born in Brescia.

The Vigenère cipher is named after Blaise de Vigenère, although Giovan Battista Bellaso had invented it before Vigenère described his autokey cipher.

== Biography ==
Bellaso was born of a distinguished family in 1505. His father was Piervincenzo, a patrician of Brescia, owner since the 15th century of a house in town and a suburban estate in Capriano, in a neighborhood called Fenili Belasi (Bellaso's barns), including the Holy Trinity chapel. The chaplain was remunerated each year with a regular salary, and a supply of firewood. The family coat of arms was ‘‘On a blue field three red-tongued gold lion heads in side view”.

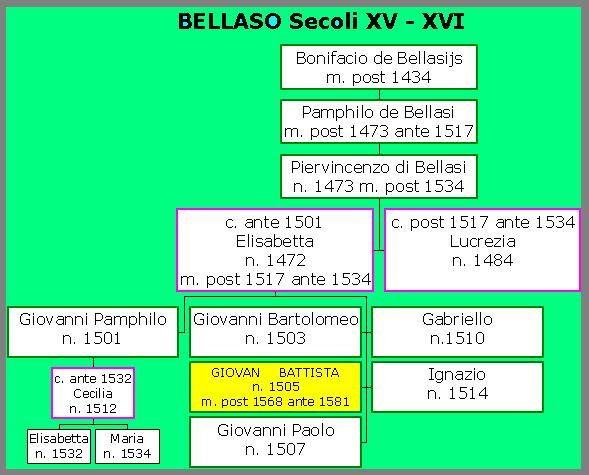
Family tree of Giovan Battista Bellaso

Bellaso received a degree in civil law at the University of Padua in 1538.

The French author, Blaise de Vigenère, reported that he was serving as a secretary in the suite of Cardinal Rodolfo Pio di Carpi and credited him with the invention of the reciprocal table, now called the Della Porta table. However, Bellaso never mentioned Cardinal Pio in his books and explained that in 1550 he was in the service of Cardinal Duranti in Camerino and had to use secret correspondence in the state affairs while his master was in Rome for a conclave. Versed in research, able in mathematics, Bellaso dealt with secret writing at a time when this art enjoyed great admiration in all the Italian courts, mainly in the Roman Curia. In this golden period of the history of cryptography, he was just one of many secretaries who, out of intellectual passion or for real necessity, experimented with new systems during their daily activities. His cipher marked an epoch and was considered unbreakable for four centuries. As a student of ciphers, he mentioned among his enthusiasts many eminent gentlemen and ‘‘great princes’’. In 1552, he met count Paolo Avogadro, count Gianfrancesco Gambara, and the renowned writer Girolamo Ruscelli, also an expert in secret writing, who urged him to reprint a reciprocal table that he was circulating in loose-leaf form, in print and manuscript. The table was to be duly completed with the instructions. Copies of these tables exist in contemporary private collections in Florence and Rome.

== Works ==
Polyalphabetic substitution with mixed alphabets, frequently changed without a period, is attributed to Leon Battista Alberti, who described it in his famous treatise De cifris of 1466. This crucial invention has a limit in that it obliges the encipherer to indicate, within the body of the cryptogram, the index letters determining the choice of the next alphabet. It was Giovan Battista Bellaso who first suggested identifying the alphabets by means of an agreed-upon countersign or keyword off-line. He also taught various ways of mixing the cipher alphabets in order to free the correspondents from the need to exchange disks or prescribed tables.

=== La Cifra del Sig. Giovan Battista Bellaso ===
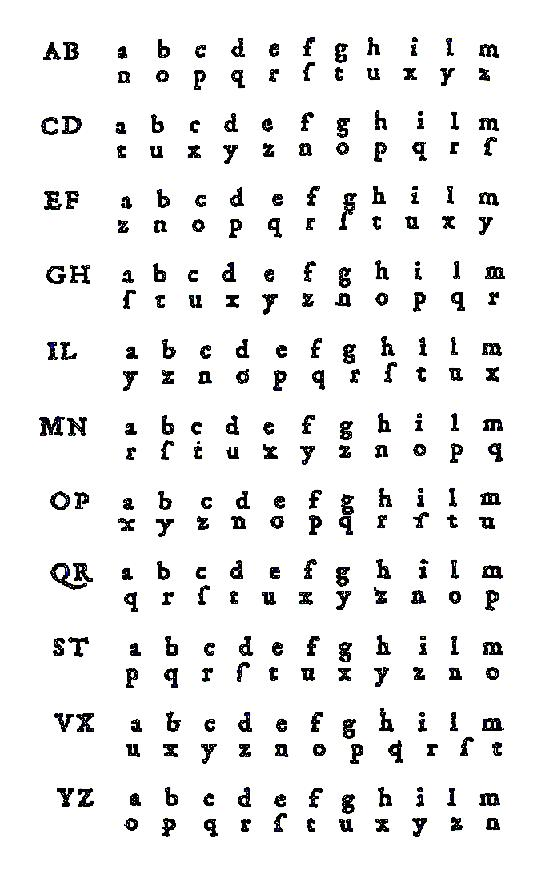
La cifra del Sig. Giovan Battista Bel[l]aso ... Venetia 1553. Reciprocal table.

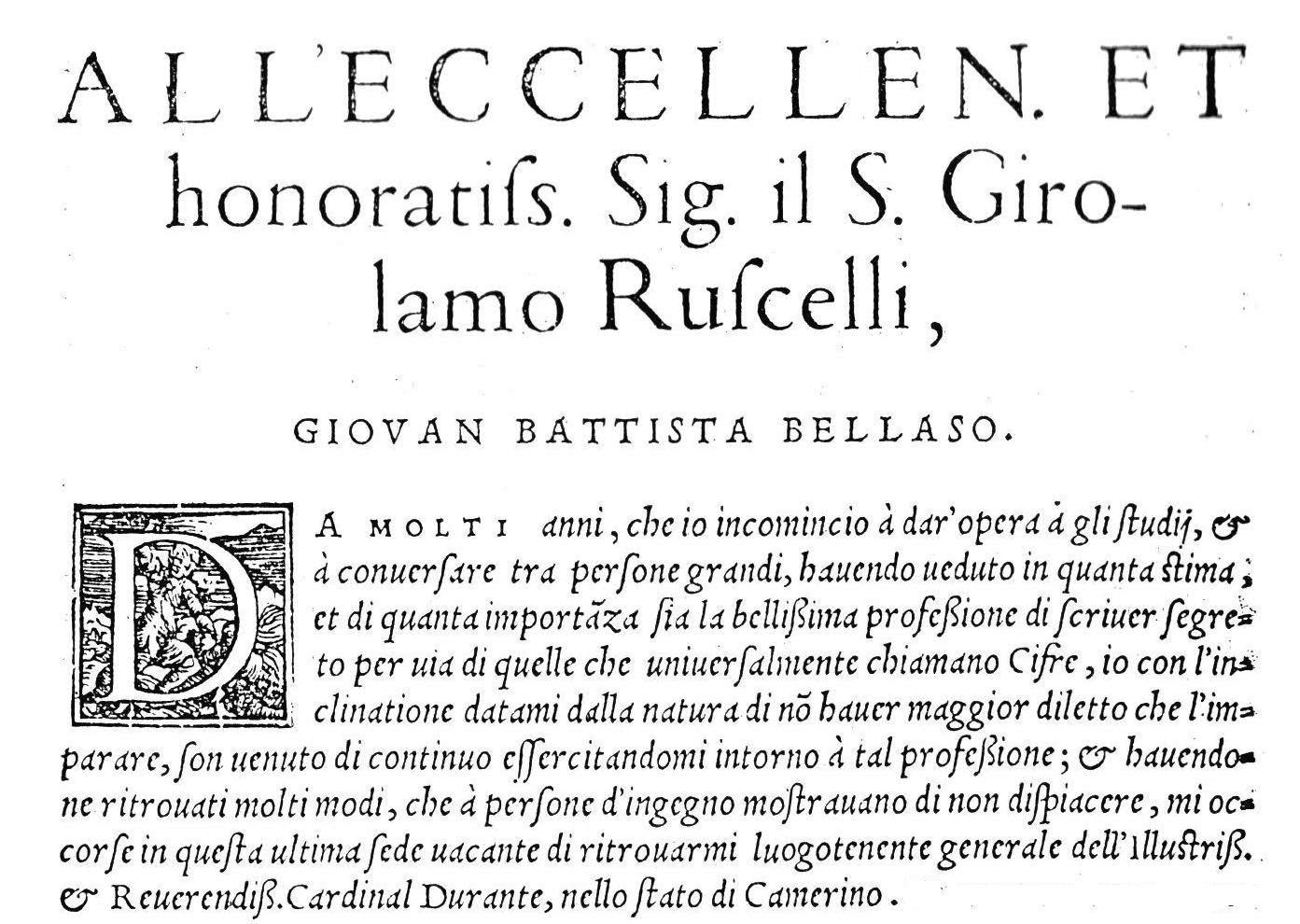
La cifra del Sig. Giovan Battista Belaso ... Venetia 1553. Foreword.

In 1553 he published his first and most important booklet: La Cifra del Sig. Giovan Battista Bel[l]aso, dedicated to Girolamo Ruscelli. For the implementation of this cipher a table is formed by sliding the lower half of an ordinary alphabet for an apparently random number of places with respect to the upper half. Actually the table can be compiled by heart by moving the lower list one place to the right following the alphabetic order of the index letters, firstly the vowels, then the consonants: A, E, I, O, V, C, G, M, Q, S, Y. Encipherment is performed by using an agreed-upon phrase called countersign, placed over the plaintext. With reference to the table, one substitutes the plaintext letter with the letter that is above or under it in the alphabet identified by the capital letter of the countersign.

Enciphering:

VIRTVTIOMNIAPARENT VIRTVTIOMNIAPARENT VI Countersign

larmataturchescapa rtiraacinquedilugl io Plaintext

SYBOVEYLDANVOFSZLP IINCVPNSHMLRNXOIZN RD Ciphertext

Deciphering:

VIRTVTIOMNIAPARENT VIRTVTIOMNIAPARENT VI Countersign

SYBOVEYLDANVOFSZLP IINCVPNSHMLRNXOIZN RD Ciphertext

larmataturchescapa rtiraacinquedilugl io Plaintext

This cipher is a letter-by-letter polysubstitution using a long literal key string. It is very similar to the Vigenère cipher, making many scholars call Bellaso its inventor, although unlike the modern Vigenère cipher Bellaso didn't use 26 different "shifts" (different Caesar's ciphers) for every letter, instead opting for 13 shifts for pairs of letters. The system is still periodic although the use of one or more long countersigns makes it sufficiently secure. This feature is perfectly in line with Kerckhoffs's principle.

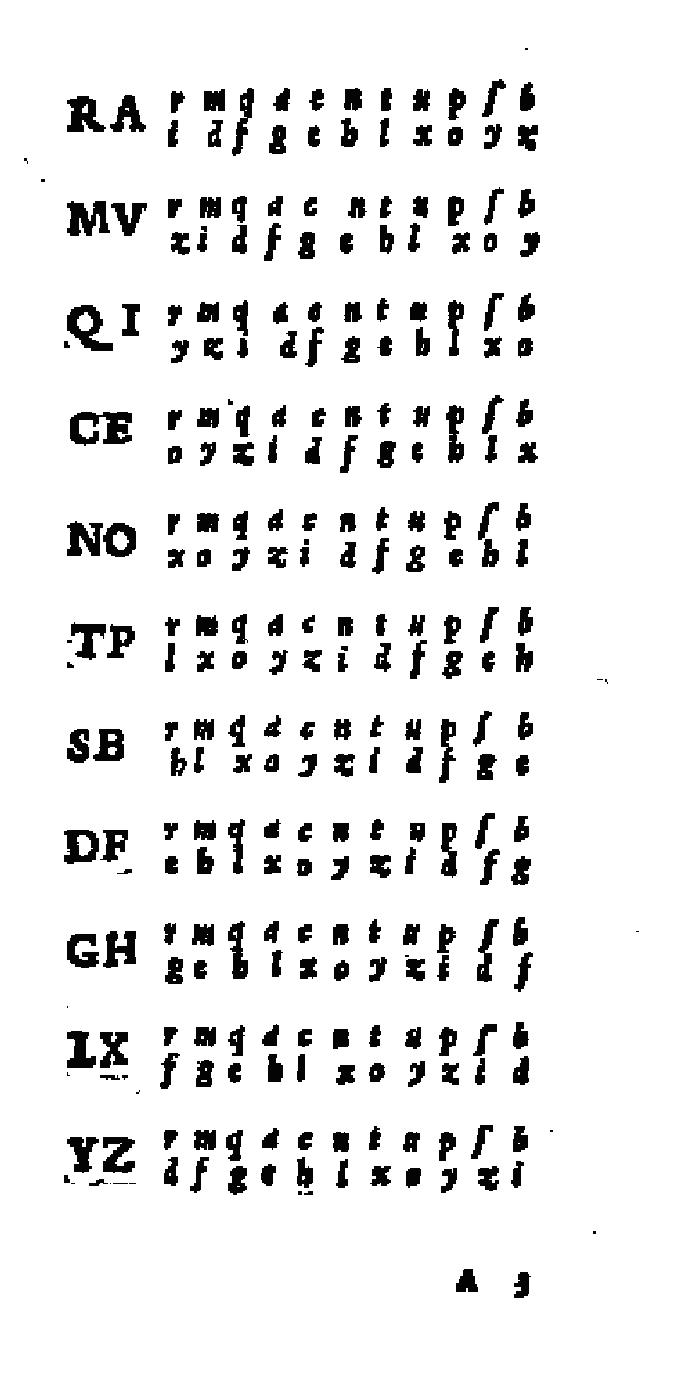
Novi et singolari modi di cifrare ... 1555. Reciprocal table with mixed alphabets.

=== Novi et singolari modi di cifrare ===
Bellaso's second booklet appeared in 1555 as a continuation of the first. The lower halves of the alphabets are now shifted regularly, but the alphabets and the index letters are mixed by means of a mnemonic key phrase, which can be different with each correspondent.

Arma uirumque cano troie qui primus ab oris

Long countersign: Qui confidunt in Domino etc...

Enciphering:

QQQQ UUUU IIII ... Countersign

Giul ioCe sare ... Plaintext

NQHP MSGN XDYT ... Ciphertext

=== Il vero modo di scrivere in cifra ===
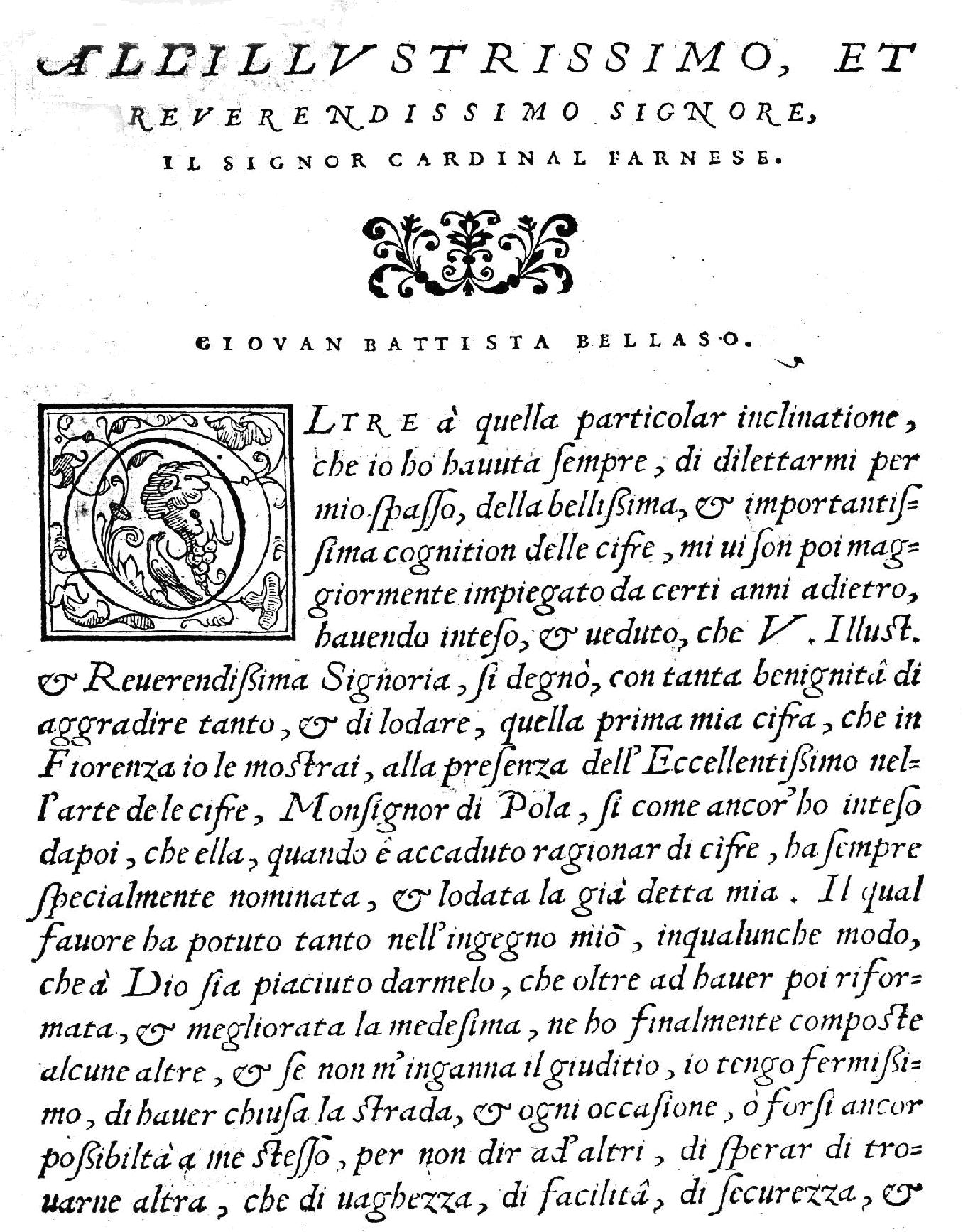
Il vero modo di scrivere in cifra ... 1564. Foreword.

Bellaso's third book was printed in 1564 and dedicated to Alessandro Farnese. It recapitulates the preceding ciphers, with many new variations with regard to their usage. All tables are used with or without countersigns or index letters. The encipherment is performed word-by-word or one letter at a time.

=== Editions ===
- La cifra (in Italian). Venezia. 1553.
- Novi et singolari modi di cifrare (in Latin). Brescia: Lodovico Britannico (1.). 1555.
- Il vero modo di scrivere in Cifra con facilità, prestezza, et securezza di Misser Giovan Battista Bellaso, gentil'huomo bresciano, Brescia, 1564.

== Autokey ==
One novelty is an encipherment using the plaintext as a key. This form of autokey involves a mixed alphabet as a prerequisite and is free from Gerolamo Cardano’s fatal defects. One form of encipherment is here exposed as follows. Given the plaintext “Ave Maria gratia plena” with Bellaso's IOVE table, the initials of each word are used as a key. The rest of the text letters are then enciphered with subsequent alphabets.

___ A____ M_____ G____ P__

aue maria gratia plena ...

MOB CXIVE QLTHXV FRDBE ...

Twenty-two years later Blaise de Vigenère described another form of autokey using a standard table primed by a single letter [Vigenère, f. 49.], which is more vulnerable than that of Bellaso's because of its regularity. Obviously by trying as primers all the alphabet letters in turn the cryptogram is solved after a maximum of 20 attempts. Vigenère himself candidely boasts the perfect regularity of his cipher:

«J’y ay, de mon invention puis-je dire, amené l’artifice de faire dependre toutes les lettres l’une de l’autre, ainsi que par enchaisnement, ou liaison de maçonnerie» [Vigenère, f. 36v.].

Bellaso's active involvement in the art for a long time is apparent. According to David Kahn,

“in combining the best of his two predecessors – the mixed alphabet of Alberti and the letter-by-letter encipherment of Trithemius – with his own brilliant idea of a literal key, he created the modern concept of polyalphabetic substitution” [Kahn, 1973].

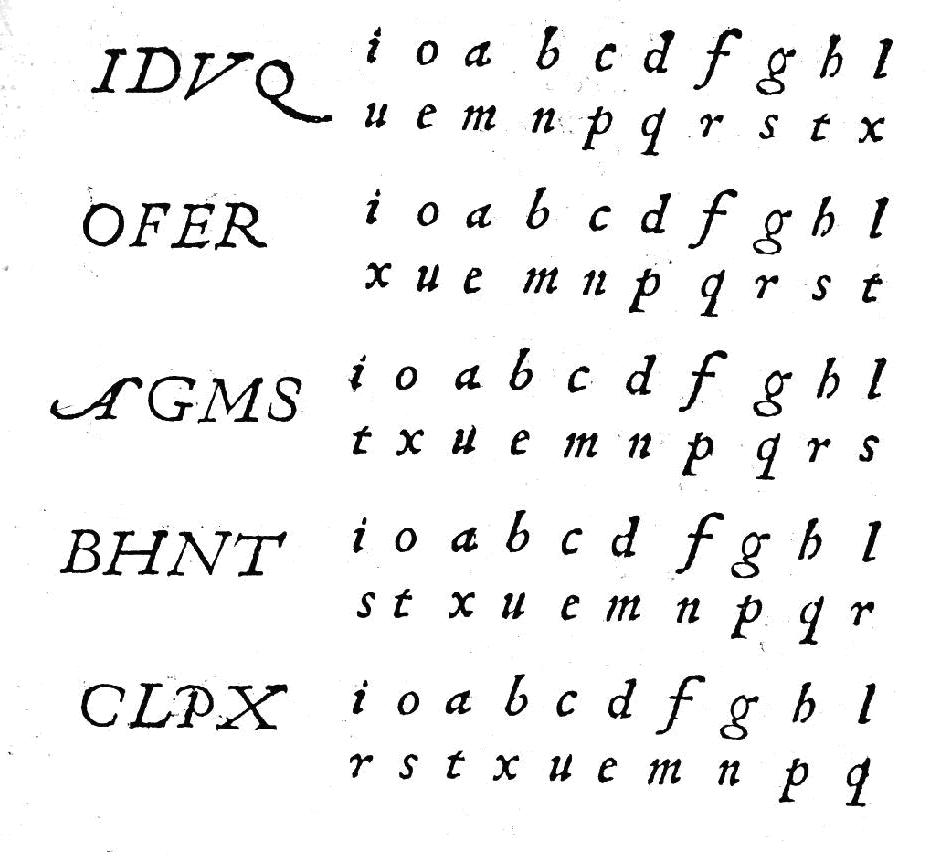
Il vero modo di scrivere in cifra ... 1564. Reciprocal table with keyword IOVE (f. 4v.).

Bellaso bitterly writes in 1564, that somebody in that same year was ‘‘sporting his clothes and divesting him of his labors and honors.’’ This is a clear allusion to Della Porta, who printed the reciprocal table in 1563 without mentioning the true inventor.

In the introduction of the book he lists thirteen qualities distinguishing his ciphers from other systems, and in a final section he claims priority for these four inventions:

1. Encipher and decipher with a single countersign.
2. Connect the words by an X or a Y.
3. Mix the alphabets by a memorized keyword.
4. Write the words using the letters of the alphabet, where other clerks employ a quantity of different characters or numbers.

=== A challenge ===
Bellaso challenged his detractors to solve some cryptograms encrypted according to his guidelines. He also furnished the following clue to help the solution of one of them: ‘‘The cryptogram contains the explanation why two balls, one in iron and one in wood, dropped from a high place will fall on the ground at the same time.’’ This is a clear statement of the law of the free-falling bodies forty years before Galileo. The 1555 challenges were purportedly solved in 2018. The seven 1564 challenges can be decrypted using the following keys: 1: MO-HUG, 2: DE-OTU, 3: QU-EHTBS, 4: SP-FXOT, 5: BA-TIS, 6: HR-DIS, 7: BARTOLMEUS-PANFILUS.

== Sources ==
- Alberti, Leon Battista, A Treatise on Ciphers [De componendis cyfris], edited by A. Buonafalce, foreword by D. Kahn, trans. by A. Zaccagnini, Galimberti Tipografi Editori, Torino 1997.
- Bellaso, Giovan Battista, La cifra del Sig. Giovan Battista Bel[l]aso, gentil’huomo bresciano, nuovamente da lui medesimo ridotta à grandissima brevità et perfettione, Venetia 1553.
- Bellaso, Giovan Battista, Novi et singolari modi di cifrare de l’eccellente dottore di legge Messer Giouan Battista Bellaso nobile bresciano, Lodovico Britannico, Brescia 1555.
- Bellaso, Giovan Battista, Il vero modo di scrivere in cifra con facilità, prestezza, et securezza di Misser Giovan Battista Bellaso, gentil’huomo bresciano, Iacobo Britannico, Bressa 1564.
- Buonafalce, Augusto, Historical Tidbits, “The Cryptogram”, vol. LVIII n. 3, Wilbraham 1992.
- Buonafalce, Augusto, Early Forms of the Porta Table, “The Cryptogram”, vol. LX n. 2, Wilbraham 1994.
- Buonafalce, Augusto, Giovan Battista Bellaso e le sue cifre polialfabetiche, Edit Srl, Lerici 1997.
- Buonafalce, Augusto, Bellaso’s Reciprocal Ciphers, “Cryptologia” 30 (1):39-51, 2006.
- Della Porta, Giovambattista, De furtivis literarum notis vulgo de ziferis, G. M. Scoto, Neapoli 1563.
- Galilei, Galileo, Intorno a due nuove scienze, “Opere”, Ediz. Naz. Vol. VIII, Firenze.
- Kahn, David, The Codebreakers, pocket book updated edition, Sphere Books, London 1973.
- Vigenère, Blaise de, Traicté des chiffres ou secrètes manières d’escrire, Abel l’Angelier, Paris 1586.
