= The Alphabet Cipher =

1868 study by Lewis Carroll

"The Alphabet Cipher" was a brief study published by Lewis Carroll in 1868, describing how to use the alphabet to send encrypted codes. It was one of four ciphers he invented between 1858 and 1868, and one of two polyalphabetic ciphers he devised during that period and used to write letters to his friends.

It describes what is known as a Vigenère cipher, a well-known scheme in cryptography. While Carroll calls this cipher "unbreakable", Friedrich Kasiski had already published in 1863 a volume describing how to break such ciphers and Charles Babbage had secretly found ways to break polyalphabetic ciphers in the previous decade during the Crimean War.
