= Alberti cipher =

Polyalphabetic substitution encryption and decryption system

The Alberti cipher disk.

The Alberti cipher, created in 1467 by Italian architect Leon Battista Alberti, was one of the first polyalphabetic ciphers. In the opening pages of his treatise De componendis cifris he explained how his conversation with the papal secretary Leonardo Dati about a recently developed movable type printing press led to the development of his cipher wheel.

== Cipher disk ==
Alberti's cipher disk embodies the first example of polyalphabetic substitution with mixed alphabets and variable periods This device, called Formula, was made up of two concentric disks, attached by a common pin, which could rotate one with respect to the other. The larger one is called Stabilis [stationary or fixed], and the smaller one is called Mobilis [movable]. The circumference of each disk is divided into 24 equal cells. The outer ring contains one uppercase alphabet for plaintext and the inner ring has a lowercase mixed alphabet for ciphertext. The outer ring also includes the numbers 1 to 4 for the superencipherment of a codebook containing 336 phrases with assigned numerical values.

This is a very effective method of concealing the code numbers, since their equivalents cannot be distinguished from the other garbled letters. The sliding of the alphabet is controlled by key letters included in the body of the cryptogram.

For an unequivocal study of this cipher, two chapters of De Cifris are herewith reproduced in English.

Chapter XIV. I will first describe the movable index. Suppose that we agreed to use the letter k as an index letter in the movable disk. At the moment of writing I will position the two disks of the formula as I wish, for example juxtaposing the index letter to capital B, with all other small letters corresponding to the capital letters above them. When writing to you, I will first write a capital B that corresponds to the index k in the formula. This means that if you want to read my message you must use the identical formula you have with you, turning the movable disk until the letter B corresponds to the index k. Thus all small letters in the ciphertext will receive the meaning and sound of those above them in the stationary disk. When I have written three or four words I will change the position of the index in our formula, turning the disk until, say, the index k is under capital R. Then I will write a capital R in my message, from this point onward the small k will no longer mean B but R, and the letters that follow in the text, will receive new meanings from the capital letters above them in the stationary disk. When you read the message you have received, you will be advised by the capital letter, which you know is only used as a signal, that from this moment the position of the movable disk and the index has been changed. Hence, you will also place the index under that capital letter, and in this way, you will be able to read and understand the text very easily. The four letters in the movable disk facing the four numbered cells of the outer ring will not have, so to speak, any meaning by themselves and may be inserted as nulls within the text. However, if used in groups or repeated, they will be of great advantage, as I will explain later on.

Chapter XV. We can also choose the index letter among the capital letters and agree between us which of them will be the index. Let us suppose we chose the letter B as an index. The first letter to appear in the message will be a small one at will, say q. Hence, turning the movable disk in the formula you will place this letter under the capital B that serves as an index. It follows that q will take the sound and meaning of B. For the other letters we will continue writing in the manner described earlier for the movable index. When it is necessary to change the setup of the disks in the formula, then I will insert one, and no more, of the numeral letters into the message, that is to say, one of the letters of the small disk facing the numbers which corresponds to, let’s say, 3 or 4, etc. Turning the movable disk I will juxtapose this letter to the agreed upon index B and, successively, as required by the logic of writing, I will continue giving the value of the capitals to the small letters. To further confuse the scrutinizers you can also agree with your correspondent that the capital letters intermingled in the message have the function of nulls and must be disregarded, or you may resort to similar conventions, which are not worth recalling. Thus changing the position of the index by rotating the movable disk, one will be able to express the phonetic and semantic value of each capital letter using twenty-four different alphabetic characters, whereas each small letter can correspond to any capital letter or any of the four numbers in the alphabet of the stationary disk. Now I come to the convenient use of the numbers, which is admirable.

== Usage ==
=== First method of encipherment ===
A lowercase letter on the smaller ring is used as an index.

In this example the letter g in the inner ring is chosen as an index and is moved under an uppercase letter (in this case A) of the stationary ring. The alphabets in use are (see figure):

ABCDEFGILMNOPQRSTVXZ1234 Stationary disk

gklnprtuz&xysomqihfdbace Movable disk

Dispatch: “La guerra si farà ...”

_LAGVER2RA_ Plaintext

AzgthpmamgQ Ciphertext

The key letters A and Q are included in the cryptogram. The small letter a resulting from the encipherment of the number 2 is a null and must be discarded in the decipherment.

After enciphering a few letters a different uppercase letter (Q) is inserted in the cryptogram and the movable disk is accordingly rotated obtaining a new combination:

QRSTVXZ1234ABCDEFGILMNOP Stationary disk

gklnprtuz&xysomqihfdbace Movable disk

The encipherment will resume thus:

_SIFARÀ Plaintext

Qlfiyky Ciphertext

The same procedure will be continued with different key letters through the end of the message.

=== The second method of encipherment ===
An uppercase letter in the stationary disk is used as an index.

In this example, the letter A is chosen as an index and the small m of the movable disk is juxtaposed to the index letter. The changes in alphabet will be indicated by enciphering one of the four numbers.

ABCDEFGILMNOPQRSTVXZ1234 Stationary disk

mqihfdbacegklnprtuz&xyso Movable disk

Dispatch: “La guerra si farà ..."

_LAGVERA3 Plaintext

mcmbufpms Ciphertext

One of the two R’s is omitted to defy cryptanalysis. The presence of the letter s enciphering the number 3 indicates the need for turning the movable disk to a new position. The letter s is then moved under the letter A.

ABCDEFGILMNOPQRSTVXZ1234 Stationary disk

somqihfdbacegklnprtuz&xy Movable disk

The encipherment will resume thus:

_SIFARÀ Plaintext

sndhsls Ciphertext

The same procedure will be continued through the end of the message, using the four numbers to designate the alphabet shifts.

The Alberti disk encipherment has nothing to do with Affine Shifts, Keyword shifts, Caesar shift or Vigenère ciphers. Caesar’s cipher is a simple substitution based on the sliding of a single ordinary alphabet with fixed key. Once the equivalent of a letter is discovered all the equivalent cipher letters are known. With the Alberti cipher there are two mixed alphabets and the key varies continuously during encryption, therefore the discovery of a single letter does not permit further progress. Frequency analysis is also impossible because the same letter is always enciphered differently. The Vigenère cipher is based on a single ordinary alphabet like that of Caesar and is easily solved after discovering its fixed period by means of the Kasiski exam. This is not possible with Alberti.

== Cryptanalysis ==
Leon Battista Alberti’s invention revolutionized encryption. Compared to previous ciphers of the time the Alberti cipher was impossible to break without knowledge of the method. This was because the frequency distribution of the letters was masked and frequency analysis - the only known technique for attacking ciphers at that time - was no help. It was also more convenient than the Vigenère cipher.

== Publications ==
- Alberti, Leon Battista, A Treatise on Ciphers, trans. A. Zaccagnini. Foreword by David Kahn, Galimberti, Torino 1997.
- Buonafalce, Augusto, “An Exercise in Solving the Alberti Disk”. The Cryptogram LIV, 5, ACA, Plano 1999.
