= Vigenère =

Vigenère may refer to:

- Blaise de Vigenère, a 16th-century French cryptographer
- The Vigenère cipher, a cipher whose invention was later misattributed to Vigenère
