= International Air Transport Association code =

Abbreviation to facilitate air travel

IATA codes are abbreviations that the International Air Transport Association (IATA) publishes to facilitate air travel. They are typically 1, 2, 3, or 4 character combinations (referred to as unigrams, digrams, trigrams, or tetragrams, respectively) that uniquely identify locations, equipment, companies, and times to standardize international flight operations. All codes within each group follow a pattern (same number of characters, and using either all letters or letter–digit combinations) to reduce the potential for error.

== Airport codes ==
IATA airport codes are trigram letter designations for airports, like "ORY" (Paris-Orly Airport), "CPT" (Cape Town International Airport), OTP (Otopeni International Airport) and "BCN" (Barcelona-El Prat).

== Airline designators ==
IATA airline designators are digram letter/digit codes for airline companies, like "M6" (Amerijet), "NH" (All Nippon Airways), and "4A" (Air Kiribati).

== Aircraft type designators ==
IATA aircraft type designators are trigram letter/digit codes used for aircraft models, like "J41" (British Aerospace Jetstream 41) and "744" (Boeing 747-400).

== Country codes ==
Digram letter codes are used for countries as specified in ISO 3166-1 alpha-2. One additional code is used:

- code XU is used to specify part of Russia east of (but not including) the Ural Mountains.

== Currency codes ==
Trigram letter codes are used for currencies as specified in ISO 4217.

== IATA time zone codes ==
IATA time zone is a country or a part of a country, where local time is the same. IATA time zone code is constructed of 2–4 characters (letters and digits) as follows:

- ISO 3166-1 alpha-2 country code is always used as first and second characters of time zone code.
- If country is not divided into separate time zones – no more characters added. Just 2 characters used.
- If country is divided into time zones – 3rd character of time zone code is a digit – number of time zone in country. Note: Russia is divided into 11 time zones, so number of time zone in country is specified by 2 digits – RU01, RU02, ... RU11.
- If some territories have the same local time, but different rules on daylight saving time – a letter can be added as 4th character to make unique codes for all such territories.

Example: Time zone code AU2 is used for Australian states New South Wales and Victoria (local time is UTC + 10 hours, DST begins at end of October). Time zone code AU2A is used for Tasmania (local time is UTC + 10 hours, DST begins at end of September). Time zone code AU2B is used for Queensland (local time is UTC + 10 hours, no DST).

== IATA region codes ==
IATA region codes trigram letters codes used to specify large territories, consisting of several countries.

Following codes are used:

- AFR - Africa
- CAR - Caribbean Sea countries
- CEM - Central America
- EUR - Europe
- TC1 - IATA American Traffic Conference (includes NOA, CEM, SOA and CAR)
- TC3 - IATA Asian Traffic Conference (includes JAK, SAS, SEA, SWP)
- TC2 - IATA European and African Traffic Conference (includes AFR, EUR, MDE)
- JAK - Japan and Korea
- MDE - Middle East
- NOA - North America
- SCH - Schengen agreement countries
- SOA - South America
- SAS - South Asia
- SEA - South-Eastern Asia
- SWP - South-West Pacific

Speaking on region codes and countries, country code RU is used to specify part of Russia west from (and including of) Ural Mountains and country code XU is used to specify part of Russia east from (and not including of) Ural Mountains. Country RU is in EUR region, country XU is in SEA region. For all other purposes only country code RU is used to specify all the territory of Russia.

Country code AQ is used to specify Antarctica. Country AQ is not in any of regions listed here.

== IATA meal codes ==
IATA Cabin Operations Safety Best Practices Guide - 19.7 Special Meals defines the following standard meal codes:

- AVML - Asian Vegetarian Meal
- BBML - Baby Meal
- BLML - Bland Meal
- CHML - Child Meal
- DBML - Diabetic Meal
- FPML - Fruit Platter Meal
- GFML - Gluten Intolerant Meal
- HNML - Hindu Meal
- KSML - Kosher Meal
- LCML - Low-Calorie Meal
- LSML - Low Sodium Meal
- MOML - Muslim Meal
- NLML - Non-Lactose Meal
- RVML - Raw Vegetarian Meal
- LFML - Low Fat Meal
- SFML - Seafood Meal
- VGML - Vegan Meal
- VJML - Vegetarian Jain Meal
- VLML - Vegetarian Lacto-ovo Meal
- VOML - Vegetarian Oriental Meal

Codes used by other airlines include:

- ALML - Allergen Meal
- CLML - Celebration Cake Meal
- HFML - High Fibre Meal
- OBML - Japanese Obento Meal (on United Airlines)
- JPML - Japanese Meal (on Japan Airlines)
- JNML - Junior Meal
- KSMLS - Kosher Meal (Snack)
- NBML - No Beef Meal (on China Airlines)
- NFML - No Fish Meal (on Lufthansa)
- LPML - Low Protein Meal
- PRML - Low Purin Meal
- ORML - Oriental Meal
- PFML - Peanut Free Meal
- SPML - Special Meal, Specify Food

== Name class codes ==
The trigram is composed of the first letter of first name and the first two letters of the names (ISO 9625)

== IATA class codes ==
IATA class codes are 1-letter codes created to help airlines standardize conditions of travel on passenger tickets and other traffic documents.

== IATA tax codes ==
List of ticket and airport tax codes:

- AB - Government Tax
- AC - Value Added Tax
- AE - Passenger Service Charge (International)
- AF - Airport Departure Fee (Domestic/International)
- AG - Ticket Tax
- AH - Airport Tax
- AI - Baggage Security Screening Fee
- AJ - Airport Exit Tax (International)
- AK - Airport Departure Tax (International)
- AL - Passenger Service Charge (Domestic/International)

== See also ==
- ICAO airport code
- List of IATA-indexed railway stations
