= Kasiski examination =

Method in cryptanalysis

In cryptanalysis, Kasiski examination (also known as Kasiski's test or Kasiski's method) is a method of attacking polyalphabetic substitution ciphers, such as the Vigenère cipher. It was first published by Friedrich Kasiski in 1863, but seems to have been independently discovered by Charles Babbage as early as 1846.

== How it works ==
In polyalphabetic substitution ciphers where the substitution alphabets are chosen by the use of a keyword, the Kasiski examination allows a cryptanalyst to deduce the length of the keyword. Once the length of the keyword is discovered, the cryptanalyst lines up the ciphertext in n columns, where n is the length of the keyword. Then each column can be treated as the ciphertext of a monoalphabetic substitution cipher. As such, each column can be attacked with frequency analysis. Similarly, where a rotor stream cipher machine has been used, this method may allow the deduction of the length of individual rotors.

The Kasiski examination involves looking for strings of characters that are repeated in the ciphertext. The strings should be three characters long or more for the examination to be successful. Then, the distances between consecutive occurrences of the strings are likely to be multiples of the length of the keyword. Thus finding more repeated strings narrows down the possible lengths of the keyword, since we can take the greatest common divisor of all the distances.

The reason this test works is that if a repeated string occurs in the plaintext, and the distance between corresponding characters is a multiple of the keyword length, the keyword letters will line up in the same way with both occurrences of the string. For example, consider the plaintext:

the man and the woman retrieved the letter from the post office

The word "the" is a repeated string, appearing multiple times. If we line up the plaintext with a 5-character keyword "beads" :

bea dsb ead sbe adsbe adsbeadsb ead sbeads bead sbe adsb eadsbe
the man and the woman retrieved the letter from the post office

The word "the" is sometimes mapped to "bea", sometimes to "sbe" and other times to "ead". However, it is mapped to "sbe" twice, and in a long enough text, it would likely be mapped multiple times to each of these possibilities. Kasiski observed that the distance between such repeated appearances must be a multiple of the encryption period.

In this example, the period is 5, and the distance between the two occurrences of "sbe" is 30, which is 6 times the period. Therefore, the greatest common divisor of the distances between repeated sequences will reveal the key length or a multiple of it.

== A string-based attack ==
The difficulty of using the Kasiski examination lies in finding repeated strings. This is a very hard task to perform manually, but computers can make it much easier. However, care is still required, since some repeated strings may just be coincidence, so that some of the repeat distances are misleading. The cryptanalyst has to rule out the coincidences to find the correct length. Then, of course, the monoalphabetic ciphertexts that result must be cryptanalyzed.

1. A cryptanalyst looks for repeated groups of letters and counts the number of letters between the beginning of each repeated group. For instance, if the ciphertext were FGXTHJAQWNFGXQ, the distance between FGX groups is 10. The analyst records the distances for all repeated groups in the text.
2. The analyst next factors each of these numbers. If any number is repeated in the majority of these factorings, it is likely to be the length of the keyword. This is because repeated groups are more likely to occur when the same letters are encrypted using the same key letters than by mere coincidence; this is especially true for long matching strings. The key letters are repeated at multiples of the key length, so most of the distances found in step 1 are likely to be multiples of the key length. A common factor is usually evident.
3. Once the keyword length is known, the following observation of Babbage and Kasiski comes into play. If the keyword is N letters long, then every Nth letter must have been enciphered using the same letter of the keytext. Grouping every Nth letter together, the analyst has N "messages", each encrypted using a one-alphabet substitution, and each piece can then be attacked using frequency analysis.
4. Using the solved message, the analyst can quickly determine what the keyword was. Or, in the process of solving the pieces, the analyst might use guesses about the keyword to assist in breaking the message.
5. Once the interceptor knows the keyword, that knowledge can be used to read other messages that use the same key.

== Superimposition ==
Kasiski actually used "superimposition" to solve the Vigenère cipher. He started by finding the key length, as above. Then he took multiple copies of the message and laid them one-above-another, each one shifted left by the length of the key. Kasiski then observed that each column was made up of letters encrypted with a single alphabet. His method was equivalent to the one described above, but is perhaps easier to picture.

Modern attacks on polyalphabetic ciphers are essentially identical to that described above, with the one improvement of coincidence counting. Instead of looking for repeating groups, a modern analyst would take two copies of the message and lay one above another.

Modern analysts use computers, but this description illustrates the principle that the computer algorithms implement.

The generalized method:

1. The analyst shifts the bottom message one letter to the left, then one more letters to the left, etc., each time going through the entire message and counting the number of times the same letter appears in the top and bottom message.
2. The number of "coincidences" goes up sharply when the bottom message is shifted by a multiple of the key length, because then the adjacent letters are in the same language using the same alphabet.
3. Having found the key length, cryptanalysis proceeds as described above using frequency analysis.
