= Blaise de Vigenère =

French cryptographer

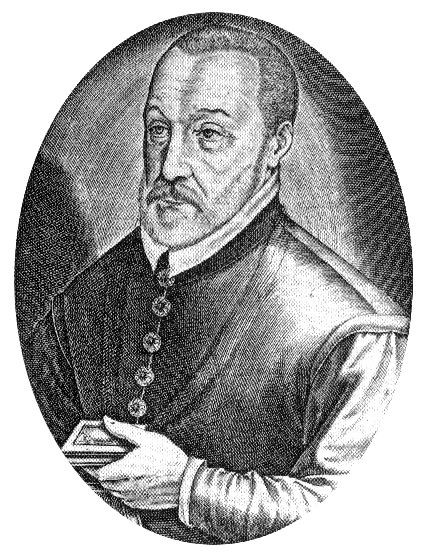
- Born: 5 April 1523; Saint-Pourçain-sur-Sioule, Kingdom of France
- Died: 19 February 1596 (aged 72); Paris, Kingdom of France
- Occupations: Diplomat, cryptographer, alchemist
- Known for: Vigenère cipher

Blaise de Vigenère (French: [viʒnɛːʁ]; 5 April 1523 – 19 February 1596) was a French diplomat, cryptographer, translator and alchemist.

== Biography ==
Vigenère was born into a respectable family in the village of Saint-Pourçain in Bourbonnais. When he was 12, his father, Jehan (modern spelling Jean) de Vigenère, arranged for him to have a classical education in Paris. Registered at the university at 14, he quit after three years without a known degree.

From 1539 to around 1545, he worked under Gilbert Bayard, a first secretary to King Francis I, who had fiefs in Bourbonnais.

In 1545, he accompanied the French envoy Louis Adhémar de Monteil, Count of Grignan, to the Diet of Worms as a junior secretary. After the diet's rupture, he traveled in Europe.

In 1547, he quit the court and entered the service of the House of Nevers. He would remain associated with it until at least a year before his death in 1596. At first he was secretary to François I, Duke of Nevers, a position he held until the deaths of the duke and his son in 1562. A letter of July 1593 reveals he was also secretary to Louis de Gonzague (who became Duke of Nevers by his marriage to François I's daughter Henriette of Cleves in 1565) and tutored Louis' son (born 1580).

In 1549, he took his first trip to Italy, in particular to Rome. It is not known who his protector was on the trip, which lasted for three to four years, but one of his biographers, Maurice Sarazin, has suggested it may have been Cardinal Tournon, a celebrated diplomat and friend of the arts. He would return to Rome again in 1566 for another three years. During his stays, he examined all the ancient buildings and expanded his knowledge of antiquity. In his 1586 book, Traicté des chiffres ou secretes manières d'escrire, he wrote:

in Rome, I did all that was possible — talking to learned men versed in Roman antiquity, visiting and revisiting the marble reliefs, bronzes, medals and ancient cameos from which one might draw knowledge and instruction — but I couldn't restore anything.

After the death of François II, Duke of Nevers, in 1562, Vigenère resumed his studies. He received lessons from Adrianus Turnebus and Jean Dorat and learned Greek and Hebrew.

In 1566, the queen mother, Catherine de Médicis, sent Vigenère to Rome, where he was secretary under Juste de Tournon, the ambassador of her son King Charles IX. In December of that year she sent a letter to Tournon, requesting that Vigenère respond to an overture made by the secretary of the elderly king of Poland, Sigismond Auguste Jagellon, who had no children. Apparently the secretary had proposed the Polish king name her son Henri (the Duke of Anjou and future King Henry III of France), as his successor. She specified Vigenère should interview the Polish diplomat verbally, verifying the proposal's authenticity, then facilitate the idea, all without revealing he had been authorized to do so by her. Nine years later, Vigenère wrote in detail about this incident in his book La description du Royaume de Poloigne, without naming himself or revealing that he could have held secrets.

During this later stay in Italy, Vigenère also visited other Italian cities, notably Venice and Florence.

In 1570, at age 47, Vigenère retired from traveling and settled in Paris to devote himself to writing. He donated his 1,000 livres a year income to the poor in Paris. He married Marie Varé on 24 July 1570.

Vigenère was a Christian Kabbalist who studied Hebrew. He was a student of well-known Christian Hebraists Gilbert Génébrard and Guy Le Fèvre de la Boderie.

He died of throat cancer in 1596 and is buried in the Saint-Étienne-du-Mont church.

== Vigenère cipher ==
On Vigenère's trips to Italy he read books about cryptography and came in contact with cryptologists. Giovan Battista Bellaso described a method of encryption in his 1553 book La cifra del. Sig. Giovan Battista Belaso, published in Venice in 1553, which in the 19th century was misattributed to Vigenère and became widely known as the "Vigenère cipher". In 1567 and 1568, Vigenère created a different, stronger autokey cipher, which he published in 1586 in his book Traicté des chiffres ou secrètes manières d'escrire (Treatise on Ciphers or Secret Ways of Writing). It differs from Bellaso's in several ways:

- Bellaso used a "reciprocal table" of five alphabets; Vigenère used ten;
- Bellaso's cipher was based on the first letter of the word; Vigenère used a letter agreed upon before communication.

== Works ==
After his retirement, Vigenère composed and translated over 20 books, including:

- 1573: Les Chroniques et annales de Poloigne. Paris: Jean Richer. Available on Gallica.
- 1573: La description du royaume de Poloigne, & pays adjacens : avec les statuts, constitutions, mœurs, & façon de faire d'iceux. Paris: Jean Richer. Digital copy available at Utrecht University.
- 1576: La somptueuse et magnifique entrée du roi Henri III en la cité de Mantoue. Paris: Nicolas Chesneau. (Includes a description of contemporary Mantua.)
- 1578: Traicté des Cometes ou estoilles chevelues, apparoissantes extraordinairement au ciel, avec leurs causes et effects, par Bl. de Vigere. Available on Gallica.
- 1582: Les Commentaires de César, des guerres de la Gaule. Mis en françois par Blaise de Vigenère, Secretaire de la Chambre du Roy. Avec quelques annotations dessus.
- 1583: Les Décades qui se trouvent de Tite-Live, mises en langue francoise avec des annotations & figures pour l'intelligence de l'antiquité romaine, plus une description particulière des lieux : & une chronologie generale des principaux potentats de la terre. Paris: Abel L'Angelier, 1583 and 1606.
- 1584: Les commentaires de Cesar, des Guerres de la Gaule. Mise en francois par Blaise de Vigenere. Bourbonnois : revues et corrigez par luy-mesme en cette derniere edition. Avec quelques annotations dessus. 1584.
- 1585: L'histoire de Geoffroy de Villehardouyn, mareschal de Champagne & de Romenie : de la conqueste de Constantinople par les barons Franc̦ois associez aux Venitiens, l'an 1204 d'vn costé en son vieil langage, & de l'autre en vn plus moderne & intelligible. Paris: Abel Langelier, 1585. Translation of De la Conquête de Constantinople from the original old French.
- 1586: Traicté des chiffres ou secrètes manières d'escrire. Available on Gallica.
- 1588: Le psaultier de David torne en prose mesuree, ou vers libres. Par Blaise de Vigenère, Bourbonnois . Paris: Abel L'Angelier.
  - Le psaultier de David: torné en prose mesurée ou vers libres, vol. 2 de Le psaultier de David: torne en prose mesurée ou vers libres, édition de 1588, Pascale Blum-Cuny, ed., Le Miroir volant, 1991.
- 1597: Les images, ou Tableaux de platte peinture de Philostrate Lemnien ,... mis en françois par Blaise de Vigénère,... avec des arguments et annotations sur chacun d'iceux... Edition nouvelle reveue corrigee et augmentee de beaucoup par le traslateur. Paris: Abel Langelier, 1597; Tournon: Claude Michel, 1611. Translation of a work by Philostratus of Lemnos; available on Gallica.
- 1618: Traicté du Feu et du Sel. Excellent et rare opuscule du sieur Blaise de Vigenère Bourbonnois, trouvé parmy ses papiers après son decés. First ed., 1608. Paris: Abel Langelier, 1618. Rouen: Jacques Calloué, 1642. A book on alchemy; available on Gallica.

== See also ==
- Vigenère cipher
- Wild Fields

== Sources ==
- Bouchard, Ernst (1861). "Notice biographique sur Blaise de Vigenère" (available at Gallica), Bulletin de la Société d'émulation du département de l'Allier: sciences, arts et belles-lettres, vol. 8, pp. 196–210.
- Fumaroli, Marc, editor (1994). Blaise de Vigenère poète & mythographe au temps de Henri III, Cahiers V.L. Saulnier, no. 11, Paris: Éditions Rue d'Ulm.
- Holden, Joshua (2017). The Mathematics of Secrets: Cryptography from Caesar Ciphers to Digital Encryption. Princeton and Oxford: Princeton University Press. ISBN 9780691141756.
- La Ferrière, Hector de, et al., editors (1880–1943). Lettres de Catherine de Médicis, eleven volumes. Paris: Imprimerie nationale. Digital copies at the BnF.
- McGowan, Margaret M. (2000). The Vision of Rome in Late Renaissance France. New haven and London: Yale University Press. ISBN 0300085354.
- Métral, Denyse (1939). Blaise de Vigenère archéologue et critique d'art. Paris: E. Droz. OCLC 1068404824.
- Moreri, Louis et al., editors (1759). Le grand dictionnaire historique, ten volumes, new [and last] edition of 1759. Paris: Librairies associés. Digital copies of the 1995 Slatkine reprints are available at the BnF.
- Sarazin, Maurice (1997). Blaise de Vigenère, Bourbonnais 1523-1596. Introduction à la vie et à l'œuvre d'un écrivain de la Renaissance, preface by Marc Fumaroli. Charroux-en-Bourbonnais: Éditions des Cahiers Bourbonnais. ISBN 9782853701488.
