= Della Porta =

Della Porta is an Italian surname. It may refer to:

- Antonella Della Porta (1927–2002), Italian actress
- Antonio della Porta (died 1702), Swiss Baroque architect
- Ardicino della Porta, iuniore (1434–1493), Italian Roman Catholic bishop and cardinal
- Bianca Della Porta (born 1991), Canadian ice hockey and rugby player
- Donatella della Porta (born 1956), Italian sociologist and political scientist
- Giacomo della Porta (1532–1602), Italian architect and sculptor
- Giambattista della Porta (1535–1615), Italian scholar, polymath and playwright
- Glauco Della Porta (1920–1976), Italian politician and economist
- Guglielmo della Porta (died 1577), Italian architect and sculptor
- Guiduccio della Porta (died 1423), Roman Catholic prelate
