= Trigram =

Special case of the n-gram, where n is 3

Trigrams are a special case of the n-gram, where n is 3. They are often used in natural language processing for performing statistical analysis of texts and in cryptography for control and use of ciphers and codes. See results of analysis of "Letter Frequencies in the English Language".

== Frequency ==
Context is very important, varying analysis rankings and percentages are easily derived by drawing from different sample sizes, different authors; or different document types: poetry, science-fiction, technology documentation; and writing levels: stories for children versus adults, military orders, and recipes.

Typical cryptanalytic frequency analysis finds that the 16 most common character-level trigrams in English are:

| Rank | Trigram | Frequency (Different source) |
|---|---|---|
| 1 | the | 1.81% |
| 2 | and | 0.73% |
| 3 | tha | 0.33% |
| 4 | ent | 0.42% |
| 5 | ing | 0.72% |
| 6 | ion | 0.42% |
| 7 | tio | 0.31% |
| 8 | for | 0.34% |
| 9 | nde | |
| 10 | has | |
| 11 | nce | |
| 12 | edt | |
| 13 | tis | |
| 14 | oft | 0.22% |
| 15 | sth | 0.21% |
| 16 | men | |

Because encrypted messages sent by telegraph often omit punctuation and spaces, cryptographic frequency analysis of such messages includes trigrams that straddle word boundaries. This causes trigrams such as "edt" to occur frequently, even though it may never occur in any one word of those messages.

== Examples ==
The sentence "the quick red fox jumps over the lazy brown dog" has the following word-level trigrams:

the quick red
quick red fox
red fox jumps
fox jumps over
jumps over the
over the lazy
the lazy brown
lazy brown dog

And the word-level trigram "the quick red" has the following character-level trigrams (where an underscore "_" marks a space):

the
he_
e_q
_qu
qui
uic
ick
ck_
k_r
_re
red
