= Variable Message Format =

Military message format

Variable Message Format, abbreviated as "VMF" and documented in MIL-STD-6017, is a message format used in communicating tactical military information. A message formatted using VMF can be sent via many communication methods. As it does not define such a method, a communications medium, or a protocol, it is not a Tactical Data Link (TDL).

== Restriction ==
The standard is designated distribution class C, meaning that it may only be distributed to federal employees and contractors. Contractors may obtain a copy from their government POC. However, the standard for the header is openly available.

== Format ==
The VMF application header is defined by MIL-STD-2045-47001. The VMF message body consists of "K" Series messages.

== See also ==
- MIL-STD-6011 (TADIL-A)
- Link 4 (TADIL-C)
- TADIL-J
- JTIDS
- Link 1
- Link 11 - (Link 11B)
- Link 16
- Link 22
- MIDS
- ACARS
