= ARKONA =

Air Command and Control System

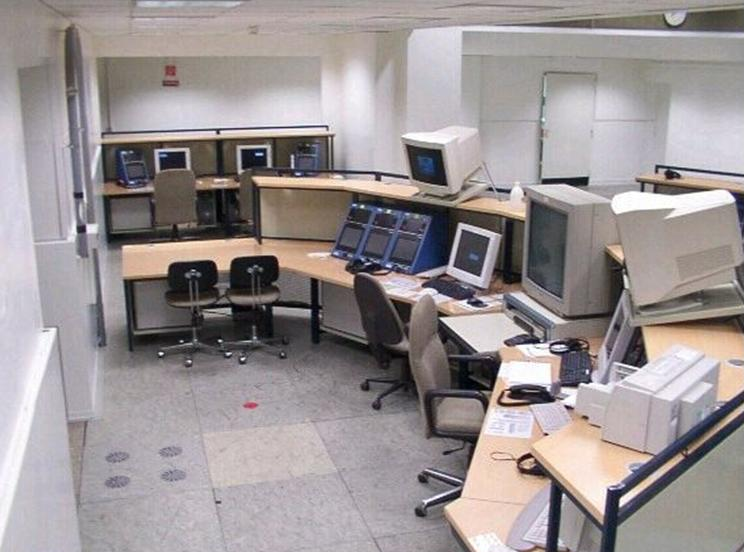
ARKONA (FüWES) in the former CRC Brockzetel, Dec 2010

ARKONA (ACCS) (German: ARKONA (FüWES)) is an Air Command and Control System of the German Air Force.

== Definition ==
According to NATO terminology, ARKONA is an Air Situation Awareness / Recognized Air Picture (RAP) system of the former National People's Army (NVA) operated by the Air Forces of the National People's Army. After the German reunification in 1990, it was adapted to NATO standards, developed to an ACCS, and integrated to the Bundeswehr / German Air Force.

The original NVA designation for it is: German: ARKONA - Automatisierte Radar Kontroll- und Navigationsanlage.

== History ==
ARKONA was developed, introduced and operated by order of the Air Forces of the National People's Army Command. The overall responsibility was with the ACOS and Chief Command Posts and Automation (de: Gefechtstände Automatisierung - GSA) Major General Dr. G. Hiemann. It was dedicated exclusively to the East German Air Force and operated on the Air Command and Control level, and according to NATO terminology was a Control and Reporting Centre (CRC).

The system design, software development, maintenance, and change were mainly provided by East German soldiers / IT engineers having an education background in the Soviet Union's S.M Budjonny Military Academy in St. Petersburg. With the final software release, the NVA was equipped with a co-primary Air Command and Control System (ACCS) which was independent from the Russian system ALMAS at that time. In terms of trust and availability, ARKONA did have advantages in comparison to ALMAS.

ARKONA had some compatibility issues with the Integrated NATO Air Defense System (ARKONA did not have full backup capability as to weapons control and operations), but the basic ideas were preserved. The general positive assessment of the ARKONA IT-Architecture initiated the final decision to transfer ARKONA to the Bundeswehr.

== Take-over and utilisation in the Bundeswehr ==
After ARKONA was taken over by the Bundeswehr, the rework of the system documentation (including the IT-Security Concept) had to be provided as this is the case with any product procured by the Bundeswehr. It also had to be subsequently upgraded to be fully compatible and interoperable with the NATO ACCS. The ARKONA system has now been embedded into the organisational structure of the German Air Force. In the time to come, the utilisation of ARKONA will take place mainly in stationary CRC, in deployable engagements, and by third-party users with the agreement of the responsible support manager.

=== Functionality today ===
ARKONA is a self-supporting system with interfaces to other IT-Architectures. Internally, the system receives Tactical Data Links(TDL) information (e.g. Link 1) and then generates, distributes and displays a Recognized Air Picture (RAP). During missions, different systems of co-ordinates can be displayed and changed. Bull's–eye Control is possible along with Vector Assistance. ARKONA is capable to receive, process, and display information from different sensors with different data formats. The appropriate CRC operational scenario in relation to military missions and training might be provided on the basis of the working position mode. Up until 2005, the processing of flight plan dates was supported by ADMAR 2000 and will eventually be supported by CIMACT.

=== Features ===
- Compatibility to The NATO Data link standards Link 1 and interoperability to the NATO Air Defence
- Maximal upper limit of targets to be processed = 3,000 Flight targets (Tracks)
- Direct connection of up to 255 sensors
- Sensor data reception via the military RADAR Data Network (MilRADNET) and the RDNAT of the Deutsche Flugsicherung (DFS)
- Conversion of any proprietary RADAR data format to the ASTERIX data standard
- Link 1 data exchange with up to 16 Air Defence Control Centres
- Data communication via the Joint Tactical Information Distribution System(JTIDS) Message Specification/Standard with AWACS
- LAN data communication via TCT/IP and UDP/IPLAN

ARKONA can process the ASTERIX categories CAT001, 002, 034 and 048, available via the civil DFS RADNAR.

=== Hardware and Software ===
ARKONA runs on COTS hardware which has to meet specific technical requirements. With the exemption of a small number of particular cases, x86-Class PCs are recommended. The operating system for ARKONA is Microsoft. Software engineering, maintenance, and change is executed by the GAF C3 Systems Support Centre (GAF C3 SSC) in Erndtebrück. The previous software (based on MS Windows and COTS hardware) changed at the end of the 1990s. Windows became permanently more complex, the hardware configuration had to be changed more frequently, and along with this the possible IT-security risks became unacceptable. In order to overcome these problems, the German Improved Air Defence System (GIADS) was introduced in 2004.

=== In-Service Support Management ===
The General Air Force Office, and later the GAF Material Command and finally the GAF Weapon Systems Command has been in charge of the ARKONA In-Service Support Management (ISSM) since its take-over to the Bundeswehr in 1990. Today this WSC provides the obsolescence management, the hardware and software configuration control and the software related instructions to the GAF C3 SSC. The in-service support manager approves and certifies on request the utilization of ARKONA by third party users.

== End of life cycle utilization ==
With the closure of the last ARKONA CRC – Brockzetel in December 2010, the stationary utilization of the ACC System was frozen. For special cases, such as the Deployable Air Situation Display and Interface Processor System (DASDIPS), and as far as the logistic maintenance remains possible, ARKONA will be used continuously. This will be the case for third party users as well. Moreover, there might be requirement for selected features e.g.:

- Interface functionality / data exchange of tactical data links
- Utilization of the ARKONA IT-Security gateway function high-to-low (certified by the National Certification Authority) in line with the Security Operating Procedures (SOP)
- ASTERIX conversion of proprietary RADRA data formats
- Mode S processing / display

DASDIPS consists mainly of deployable hardware and software products operated by the GAF Tactical Command and Control Service (TACCS). Some of these components include the ARKONA System, the remaining terrestrial radio systems of the Aeronautical Mobile Service (R-863, AMS East) and the CSI System. DASDIPS is mainly dedicated to support limited operations (e.g. to provide assistance to the Federal Police, exercises, etc.) with the emphasis on RAP display, interface functionality, and the improvement of the Air Situation Awareness.

At present, the successor product GIADS is operational in the stationary and deployable CRCs.
