= Link 4 =

Link 4 is a non-secure data link used for providing vector commands to USAF and other NATO fighter aircraft. It is a netted, time division link operating in the UHF band at 5,000 bits per second. There are 2 separate "Link 4s": Link 4A and Link 4C.

Link 4A TADIL C is one of several Tactical Data Links now in operation in the United States Armed Services and forces of the North Atlantic Treaty Organization (NATO). Link-4A plays an important role by providing digital surface-to-air, air-to-surface, and air-to-air tactical communications. Originally designated Link-4, this link was designed to replace voice communications for the control of tactical aircraft. The use of Link-4 has since been expanded to include communication of digital data between surface and airborne platforms. First installed in the late 1950s, Link-4A has achieved a reputation for being reliable. But Link-4A's transmissions are not secure, nor are they jam-resistant. However, Link-4A is easy to operate and maintain without serious or long-term connectivity problems.

Link 4C is a fighter-to-fighter data link which is intended to complement Link 4A although the two links do not communicate directly with each other. Link 4C uses F-series messages and provides some measure of ECM resistance. Link 4C is fitted to the F-14 only and the F-14 cannot communicate on Link 4A and 4C simultaneously. Up to 4 fighters may participate in a single Link 4C net. It is planned that Link 16 will assume Link 4A's role in AIC and ATC operations and Link 4C's role in fighter-to-fighter operations. However Link 16 is not currently capable of replacing Link 4A's ACLS function and it is likely that controlled aircraft will remain equipped with Link 4A to perform carrier landings. Message standards are defined in STANAG 5504 while standard operating procedures are laid down in ADatP 4.

== See also ==
- JTIDS
- Link 1
- Link 11 - (Link 11B)
- Link 16
- Link 22
- MIDS
- ACARS
