= Tadil (disambiguation) =

- TADIL-J system of standardized J-series messages
- Tactical data link
- MIL-STD-6011
- Tadil village in India
- S-TADIL J real-time Beyond Line-of-Sight Tactical Digital Information Link
