= GIADS =

GIADS - German Improved Air Defence System - is the standard Air Command and Control System (ACC System / AC2 – System) of the German Air Force Tactical Command and Control Service (GAF TACCS).

== Definition ==
GIADS is the standard ACC System of the GAF TACCS. It is operated in the static Control and Reporting Centres (CRC Erndtebrück and CRC Schönewalde) and the deployable CRC (on Holzdorf Air Base) in order to provide Airspace Surveillance, to control Air Force Operations, and to meet the military commitment of the Bundeswehr.

== History ==
Up to the year 2000 the standard AC2 System of the GAF TACCS was ARKONA which had been taken over former the former East German Air Force. In the time to come it had to be replaced by the successor system GIADS. In July 2000 the first GIADS CRC in Schönewalde became operational. Since that time GIADS has been improve, further developed and introduced to the other German CRCs (including Deployable CRC). By the introduction of GIADS III in 2010/11, the probable final GAF AC2 System's generation might have been procured.

== Prospect ==
GIADS III should be replaced in line with the joint NATO procurement programme by the successor AC2 product, the Air Command and Control System (ACCS).

== Functionality ==
- Coincident / parallel RADAR data processing of up to 20 different civil/military sensors data sources
- Correlation with civil flight plan data
- Processing of a Recognized Air Picture (RAP)
- Control of military aircraft and Surface to Air Missile (SAM) units
- Data Recording an Replay function
- Processing of up to 12,000 plots; 3,000 system tracks and 1,000 flight plan
- ICAO Mode S capability

=== Advantages in comparison to ARKONA ===
- Automatic selection of the most beneficial radar data source by Multi-Sensor-Tracking
- Decisive enhancement of the Fighter Control capability
- NATO Link 16 capability (interim / disposal solution)
- Enhanced support (e.g. emergence cases, air space violations, critical air vehicles)
- Data exchange with up to 24 external AC2 Systems
- Improved IT-Security

== In-Service Support Management ==
The GAF Material Command, followed by the GAF Weapon Systems Command – WSC (de: Waffensystemkommando der Luftwaffe – WaSysKdoLw), have been in charge of the GIADS In-Service Support Management (ISSM). Today this WSC provides the obsolescence management, the hardware and software configuration control and the software related instructions to that GAF C3 SSC and EADS, in charge of GIADS software change and maintenance.

== Sources ==
- 50 Years of GAF TACCS 1960 – 2010, L. Fölbach 2001, www.foelbach.de
- Mil. Glossary of studies, Federal office of foreign languages (de: Studienglossar, Bundessprachenamt) 50354, actual issue
