= S-TADIL J =

S-TADIL J, or Satellite TADIL J, is a real-time Beyond Line-of-Sight (BLOS) Tactical Digital Information Link (TADIL) supporting the exchange of the same J Series message set that is implemented on Link-16 via the Joint Tactical Information Distribution System (JTIDS). S-TADIL J provides for robust continuous connectivity between Navy ships that are beyond JTIDS line-of-sight (LOS) transmission range. S-TADIL J is designed to support and significantly improve long-range TADIL connectivity between widely dispersed fleet operational forces. With the deployment of S-TADIL J, operational units will have three possible data link paths that can be used to support multi-ship data link-coordinated operations. S-TADIL J supports the same levels of surveillance and weapon coordination data exchange provided by Link-11 and Link-16. The TADIL J message standard is implemented on S-TADIL J to provide for the same level of information content as Link-16.

== Change of terminology ==
In the US, the term Tactical Digital Information Link (TADIL) is obsolete (per DISA guidance) and is now more commonly known as Tactical Data Link (TDL).

== See also ==
- Tactical Data Links (TDLs)
- Standard Interface for Multiple Platform Evaluation (SIMPLE), allows (Beyond Line of Sight) transmission of M-Series and J-Series messages over IP-based protocols.
- Joint Range Extension Applications Protocol (JREAP), allows transmission of M-Series and J-Series messages over long-distance networks.
