= SIMPLE (military communications protocol) =

Military protocol for data communications

The Standard Interface for Multiple Platform Link Evaluation (SIMPLE) is a military communications protocol defined in NATO's Standardization Agreement STANAG 5602.

== Purpose ==
SIMPLE defines a communications protocol to provide the means for geographically (national and international) separated Tactical Data Link (TDL) equipment (C4ISR, C2 and non-C2 test facilities) to exchange environment data and TDL messages in order to conduct detailed TDL Interoperability (IO) testing. It is intended to provide specifications for a common standard to interconnect ground rigs of all types, such as simulation and integration facilities. The SIMPLE allows transmission of M-Series and J-Series messages over IP-based protocols. Previously J-Series messages could be sent using the Link 16 protocol. However, Link 16 is a radio protocol with a frequency range that limits the exchange of information to within line-of-sight. Use of flexible bearer protocols, such as IP, makes it easier to exchange such J-Series data, particularly for simulations and integration. However, the SIMPLE is not limited to use for simulation and integration, and is finding applications beyond its original purpose wherever transmission of J-Series data is not amenable over radio protocols such as Link 16.

== Distributed Interactive Simulation (DIS) protocols ==
The SIMPLE standard specifies the distributed transfer of a simulated scenario/synthetic environment using the IEEE Distributed Interactive Simulation (DIS) protocols. DIS is a government/industry initiative to define an infrastructure for linking simulations of various types at multiple locations to create realistic, complex, virtual worlds for the simulation of highly interactive activities. A new protocol data unit (PDU) definition, the DIS PDU was added to the baseline protocol to support the exchange of DIS PDUs for simulated entities. The content of the SIMPLE DIS PDU packet is related to the DIS PDUs defined in the IEEE 1278.1 standard. As such, most Transmitter and Signal PDU fields require no translation.

== Structure of the SIMPLE protocol ==
The SIMPLE standard consists of several elements. These are:

- the communications bearer (e.g. telephone lines, digital WANs)
- the encryption methods to be used to protect the secure information transmitted between sites
- the protocols/data formats for the data transfer process
- additional aspects such as time co-ordination

SIMPLE is an application layer protocol that is designed to be independent of the transport layer. It can run using the following transport layer protocols:

- UDP broadcast
- UDP multicast
- TCP
- Serial

== TDL message exchange ==
In SIMPLE, the method for exchanging TDL messages is to take the host generated message traffic from the MIDS/JTIDS terminal interface and repackage it for transmission across the SIMPLE network. The receiving SIMPLE node extracts the TDL message traffic from the received packet and presents it to the host interface as if it had been received from a MIDS/JTIDS terminal.

== Addressing ==
The addressing supports specific nodes, groups, and broadcast to all. These address forms are independent of the transport, which may have similar concepts (Serial and TCP point-to-point, UDP multicast and broadcast). Any SIMPLE addressing needs to go over any physical transport layer (although that may be open to interpretation).

== History ==
The development of SIMPLE resulted from the requirement in February 1996 of the Ad Hoc Working Group (AHWG) on NATO Common Interoperability Standards (NCIS) Testing for a single interface standard to support the interconnection of NATO resources.

== See also ==
- Link 16
- M-Series messages
- J-Series messages
- Tactical Data Links (TDLs)
- S-TADIL J (J-Series messages over satellite links)
- JREAP (M-Series and J-Series messages over long-distance networks)
- Global Information Grid
- Network-centric warfare
