= Air Force Command and Control Integration Center =

- Active: 1997–2013
- Country: United States
- Branch: United States Air Force
- Role: Command and Control integration
- Decorations: Air Force Organizational Excellence Award

Insignia
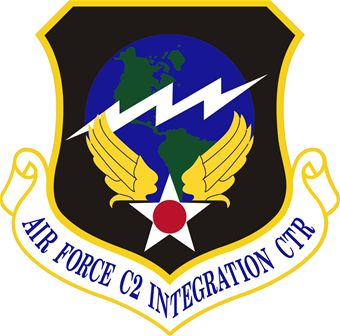
- Air Force Command and Control Integration Center emblem (Note: Approved 15 September 2010.)

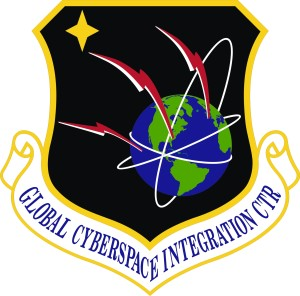
- Global Cyberspace Integration Center emblem (Note: Approved 16 December 2008.)

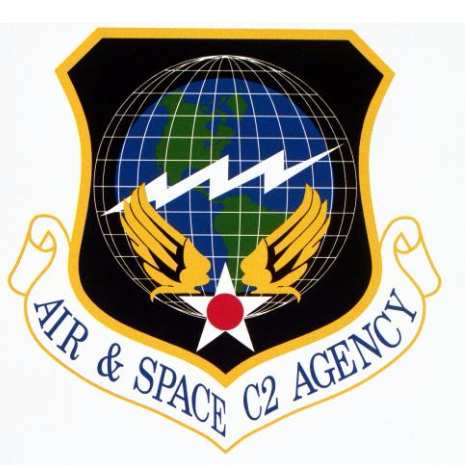
- Air and Space Command and Control Agency emblem (Note: Approved 15 October 1997.)

The Air Force Command and Control Integration Center was an Air Combat Command field operating agency responsible for innovating, designing, developing, integrating, and sustaining command and control capabilities. It was a tenant unit at Langley Air Force Base, with several outlying support locations.

The center was established in 1997 and inactivated in 2013. It had gone through numerous name and organizational changes, but maintained essentially the same mission throughout. From 2002 through 2010, it was aligned directly under the Air Staff.

== History ==
The center was initially established at Langley Air Force Base, Virginia, in August 1997 as the Air and Space Command and Control Agency. The agency included the two major field units that became the Air Force C2 Battlelab and the Air Force C2 Training and Innovation Group. The Tactical Air Forces Interoperability Group was a predecessor organization under Tactical Air Command. It was focused primarily on tactical interoperability and the improvement and integration of Tactical Data Links and message text formats.

The agency's name was changed to reflect its widening responsibilities. When Intelligence, surveillance, and reconnaissance was added to the agency's mission in September 1998, it was redesignated the 'Aerospace Command and Control Agency. A few months later, on 1 January 1999, the agency added responsibilities including unmanned aerial vehicles, and became the Aerospace Command and Control & Intelligence, Surveillance and Reconnaissance Center. The Center eventually gained the Unmanned Aerial Vehicle Battlelab, and fifteen operating locations intended to network the command and control mission.

In 2002, the Center underwent its most profound change organizationally since its creation. On 15 March 2002 the Center was redesignated the Air Force Command and Control & Intelligence, Surveillance and Reconnaissance Center and realigned as a field operating agency under the Air Force Deputy Chief of Staff for Warfighting Integration. . In April 2007, the center was redesignated the Air Force Global Cyberspace Integration Center signifying an Air Force cultural shift to the cyberspace domain while still maintaining its responsibilities for C2 integration. A little over three years later, on 16 June 2010, the center was realigned under the Air Combat Command (ACC) Directorate of Requirements and named the Air Force Command and Control Integration Center.

In January 2013, the Commander of ACC announced his intention to reorganize the headquarters staff to formulate a consolidated planning, programming and requirements directorate. As part of this planned reorganization, the center would be inactivated and its functions and personnel merged into the new directorate. An informal closing ceremony was held on 16 December 2013.

=== Systems developed ===
==== Air Operations Center ====
The Aerospace Operation Center (later Air Operations Center, AOC) was an important mission for the center. The AOC was declared a weapon system on 8 September 2000. The first Combined Aerospace Operations Center-Experimental was built at Langley Air Force Base. The next CAOC created was established over the following year at Prince Sultan Air Base, Saudi Arabia. Leading the AOC effort through large-scale experiments, for seven years the Center modernized, standardized, and integrated the developing command and control system.

==== Joint Expeditionary Force Experiment ====
Starting in 1998 as the Air Force's [single service] expeditionary force experiment, this experimentation and testing venue allowed innovators and formal acquisition programs to try out new equipment, tactics, procedures in a large-scale field environment. The equipment tested included command, control and communications systems, vehicles, aircraft, software, radios, etc., focused on enhancing information collection and exchange, and improving interoperability. The venue quickly grew to include multiple services and nations. It was subsequently conducted biannually in 2000, 2002, 2004, 2006, 2008 with particular emphasis on command and control and improving the "Kill Chain". More recently, it was supposed to be downsized to focus on specific areas for improvement in Command and control integration and conducted on a smaller scale on a quarterly basis with occasional large-scale events.

==== Tactical Networks Integration ====
Tactical Data Links (TDL) and voice networks are essential to command and control and situational awareness of forces in the battlespace from the tactical edge to joint task forces. The center integrated these networks for the Air Force, other services, and other nations throughout its history including Link 11 and Link 16 improvements; TDL network management, integrators and gateways; Joint Tactical Radio System; and developments in Airborne Networking.

== Lineage ==
- Constituted as the Air and Space Command and Control Agency on 15 July 1997 (Note: Preparing for the agency's activation, Air Combat Command organized the Air & Space Command & Control Agency (Provisional) at Langley Air Force Base on 9 May 1997. The provisional agency was discontinued on 1 August.)

Activated on 1 August 1997
Redesignated Aerospace Command and Control Agency on 15 September 1998
Redesignated Aerospace Command and Control & Intelligence, Surveillance and Reconnaissance Center on 9 February 1999
Redesignated Air Force Command and Control & Intelligence, Surveillance and Reconnaissance Center on 15 March 2002
Redesignated Global Cyberspace Integration Center on 1 April 2008
Redesignated Air Force Command & Control Integration Center on 15 June 2010
Inactivated c. 16 December 2013

=== Assignments ===
- Air Combat Command, 1 August 1997
- United States Air Force, 30 April 2002 (Note: This also changed the center's status to a field operating agency.)
- Air Combat Command, 15 June 2010 – c. 16 December 2013 (Note: This also terminated the center's status as a field operating agency.)

=== Components ===
- Unmanned Aerial Vehicle Battlelab: 1 March 1999 – April 2002

=== Stations ===
- Langley Air Force Base, Virginia, 1 August 1997 – c. 16 December 2013

=== Commanders ===
- Maj Gen John W. Hawley, July 1997 – June 1999
- Maj Gen Gerald F. Perryman, May 1999 – August 2001
- Maj Gen Robert F. Behler, August 2001 – July 2003
- Maj Gen Tommy F. Crawford, July 2003 – June 2006
- Maj Gen Kevin J. Kennedy, June 2006 – July 2007
- Brig Gen Mike H. McClendon, July 2007 – January 2008
- Stan C. Newberry (Director), January 2008 – 2013

== See also ==
- Joint Interoperability of Tactical Command and Control Systems
- Network-centric warfare
- Vocabulary OneSource
