= JREAP =

Military datalink system

The Joint Range Extension Applications Protocol (JREAP) enables tactical data messages to be transmitted over long-distance networks, e.g. satellite links, thereby extending the range of Tactical Data Links (TDLs).

JREAP is documented in U.S. Military Standard (MIL-STD) 3011 and NATO Standardization Agreement (STANAG) 5518, "Interoperability Standard for the Joint Range Extension Applications Protocol (JREAP)."

== Purpose ==
JREAP was developed due to the need to communicate data over long distances without degradation to the message format or content. JREAP takes the message from the format it was originally formatted in and changes the protocol so that the message can be transmitted over Beyond Line-of Sight media.

JREAP is the protocol and message structure for the transmission and reception of pre-formatted messages over communications media other than those for which these messages were designed.

JREAP provides a foundation for Joint Range Extension (JRE) of Link 16 and other tactical data links to overcome the line-of-sight limitations of radio terminals such as the Joint Tactical Information Distribution System (JTIDS) and Multifunctional Information Distribution System (MIDS), and extends coverage of these data links through the use of long-haul media.

== Versions ==
JREAP A
JREAP A uses an Announced Token Passing protocol for half-duplex communications. This protocol may be used when several terminals share the same JRE media and take turns transmitting or in a broadcast situation when one transmits and the rest receive. It is targeted to data rates down to 2400 bits per second on a serial data interface with a TSEC/KG-84A/KIV-7 or a compatible encryption device used for data security. It is designed for use with media such as: 25-kHz UHF Time-Division Multiple Access TDMA /Demand Assigned Multiple Access (DAMA) SATCOM, EHF Low Data Rate (LDR) Forced Mode Network Operations and 5 and 25 kHz UHF non-DAMA SATCOM.
JREAP B
JREAP B is a synchronous or asynchronous point-to-point mode of the JREAP. This mode is similar in design to the Half-Duplex Announced Token Passing protocol used by JREAP A. This mode can be used with SHF and EHF LDR point-to-point mode synchronous connections, STU-III operations via phone lines and other point-to-point media connections. This JREAP application presumes full-duplex data-transparent communication media.
JREAP C
JREAP C makes use of the Internet Protocol (IP) in conjunction with either the User Datagram Protocol (UDP) or Transmission Control Protocol (TCP). The IP suite is a standard set of protocols that is deployed worldwide in commercial as well as military networks. By using JREAP encapsulation over IP, JRE can be performed over IP-based networks that meet operational requirements for security, speed of service and so on.

== See also ==
- Global Information Grid
- Network-centric warfare
- S-TADIL J (J-Series messages over satellite links)
- SIMPLE (M-Series and J-Series messages over IP-based networks)
