= List of U.S. arms sales to Taiwan =

This is the list of U.S. arms sales to Taiwan since 1979 when the United States and the People's Republic of China established diplomatic relations. Under provisions of the Taiwan Relations Act, the U.S. government is required to provide weapons of a defensive nature to Taiwan.

== Jimmy Carter (1977–1981) ==
Date	Arms	Value (million)	Note
1979-07	48 F-5E	$240	
1979-11	500 AGM-65 Maverick	$25	1982-11
1980-01	BGM-71 TOW, MIM-23 Hawk, MIM-72 Chaparral	$280	
1980-07	M110A2 howitzer	$3.7	

== Ronald Reagan (1981–1989) ==
Date	Arms	Value (million)	Note
1982-04	Aircraft parts	$0.64	
1982-06	Armored personnel carriers, mortar vehicle, command vehicle	$97	
1982-08		$620	
1982-11	Vehicles, including spare parts and ancillary equipment	$97	
1983-02	66 F-104G		
1984-06	12 C-130	$325	
1985-02	F-5, F-100, T-33, T-28 radar and spare parts	$86	
1985-06	262 MIM-72 Chaparral	$94	
1986-08	S-2T, AN/TPQ-37, S-2E/G, Oliver Hazard Perry-class frigate (Cheng Kung-class frigate)	$260	

== George H. W. Bush (1989–1993) ==
Date	Arms	Value (million)	Note
1989	88 Standard Missiles	$44	
1990-07-26	F-5, F-104, C-130 Radar	$108	
1991-09-13	110 M60A3	$119	
1992	8 C-130H	$220	
1992-07	3 Knox-class frigates (Rental)	$230	1993-07
1992-08-04	207 RIM-66E SM-1 surface-to-air missile	$126	
1992-09-14	150 F-16 A/B blk.20	$6,000	1997-04

== Bill Clinton (1993–2001) ==
Date	Arms	Value (million)	Note
1993-01	200 Patriot missiles and related equipment	$10,000	1996-08
1993-03	4 E-2T	$900	1995-09
1993-06	Aircraft parts, radar and navigation equipment	$590	
1993-11	150 Mark 46 torpedoes and associated components	$54	
1994-02	3 Knox-class frigates (Rental)	$230	1995-07
1994-09	4 MSO designation minesweepers		1995-02
1994-10	2 Newport-class tank landing ships (Rental)	$2.6	1995-02
1995-05	160 M60A3 TTS	$223	1996
1996-08	1,299 FIM-92 Stinger, 74 AN/TWQ-1 Avenger launchers, 96 Humvee	$420	
1996-09-05	110 MK-46 MOD 5 torpedoes, etc.	$66	
1997-02-24	54 Harpoon missiles with containers, etc.	$95	
1997-05-23	1,786 TOW 2A anti-armor guided missiles (to include 27 Lot Acceptance missiles), 114 TOW launchers, 100 M1045A2 Humvee trucks, etc.	$80	
1997-07-24	21 AH-1W Super Cobra helicopters, etc.	$479	
1997-09-03	13 OH-58D Kiowa Warrior Armed Scout helicopters with mast mounted sight subsystems, 13 T703-AD-700 helicopter engines, 13 HELLFIRE launchers, Hydra 70 rockets and rocket launchers, etc.	$172	
1997-11-09	Provide funds for the establishment of a Cooperative Logistics Supply Support Arrangement (CLSSA) for spare parts in support of F-5B/E/F, F-104, F-16, C-130, C-119, C-47, and T-38 aircraft and for U.S. systems and sub-systems of the Indigenous Defense Fighter (IDF) aircraft.	$140	
1997-11-09	The continuation of a pilot training program (21st Fighter Squadron) and logistics support for F-16 aircraft, etc.	$280	
1998-01-28	3 Knox-class frigates (FF-1052), weapons and ammunition to include 1 MK 15 PHALANX Close-In Weapons System (CIWS), 1 AN/SWG-1A Harpoon launcher, etc.	$300	
1998-06-01	28 sets of Pathfinder/Sharpshooter navigation and targeting pods (LANTIRN downgraded derivative), integration of the pods with the F-16A/B aircraft, etc.	$160	
1998-08-27	131 MK 46 MOD 5(A)S torpedoes, etc.	$69	
1998-08-27	61 dual-mount Stinger Missile Systems, etc.	$180	
1998-08-27	58 Harpoon anti-ship missiles, etc.	$101	
1998-10-09	9 CH-47SD Chinook helicopters, etc.	$486	
1999-05-26	240 AGM-114K3 Hellfire II air-to-surface anti-armor missiles, etc.	$23	
1999-05-26	5 exportable AN/VRC-92E SINCGARS radio systems, 5 Commercial Off-the Shelf/Non-Developmental Item (COTS/NDI) Intelligence Electronic Warfare (IEW) systems, 5 HMMWV, etc.	$64	
1999-07-30	2 E-2T Hawkeye 2000E aircraft, etc.	$400	
1999-07-30	Provide funds for the establishment of a Cooperative Logistics Supply Support Arrangement (CLSSA) for spare parts in support of F-5E/F, C-130H, Indigenous Defense Fighter, F-16A/B with Block 15 Mid-Life Upgrade and for U.S. systems and sub-systems of the aircraft.	$150	
2000-03-16	A conversion of TPS-43F air surveillance radar to TPS-75V configuration, etc.	$96	
2000-03-02	162 Hawk Intercept Aerial guided missiles, etc.	$106	
2000-06-07	39 sets of LANTIRN downgraded derivative (AN/AAQ-20 Pathfinder and AN/AAQ-19 Sharpshooter) navigation and targeting pods, etc.	$234	
2000-06-07	48 AN/ALQ-184 Electronic Countermeasures pods, support equipment, etc.	$122	
2000-09-27	continued Improved Mobile Subscriber Equipment (IMSE) communication system, etc.	$513	
2000-09-27	146 M109A5 155 mm self-propelled howitzers, 79 M2 machine gun, 6 M88A2 recovery vehicles, 160 AN/PVS-7B Night Vision Goggles, 146 AN/VRC-87E and 6 AN/VRC-90E SINCGARS, etc.	$405	
2000-09-27	71 RGM-84L Harpoon anti-ship missiles	$240	
2000-09-27	200 AIM-120 AMRAAM, 292 LAU-129 missile launchers, etc.	$150	

== George W. Bush (2001–2009) ==
Date	Arms	Value (million)	Note
2001-04-24	8 diesel-electric submarines, 12 P-3C Orion anti-submarine warfare (ASW) aircraft, 54 Mk-48 ASW torpedoes, 44 Harpoon submarine-launched anti-ship cruise missiles, 144 M109A6 Paladin self-propelled howitzers; 54 AAV7A1 amphibious assault vehicles; AN/ALE-50 electronic countermeasure (ECM) systems for F-16s; and 12 MH-53 mine-sweeping helicopters. 4 decommissioned Kidd-class destroyers sold as Excess Defense Articles (EDA), PAC-3 missile defense missile	$18,000	Invalid, some packages were redrafted afterward.
2003-11	200 AIM-120C-5		
2004-03-30	2 AN/FPS-115 ultra high frequency long range early warning radars	$1,776	One built
2007-02-28	218 AIM-120C air-to-air missiles, 235 AGM-65 air-to-ground missiles.	$125	
2007-08-08	60 AGM-84L air-launched anti-ship missiles.	$421	
2007-09-13	144 RIM-66K SM-2 block IIIA surface-to-air missiles.	$272	
2007-09-13	12 P-3C maritime patrol aircraft.	$1,960	
2007-11-13	Patriot II missile system upgrades.	$939	incomplete
2008-10-03	330 MIM-104F PAC-3 missiles, 4 launch system.	$3,100	
2008-10-03	32 UGM-84L sub-launched anti-ship missiles.	$200	
2008-10-03	Spare parts for F-16, C-130H, F-5E/F, Indigenous Defense Fighter (IDF), and other aircraft.	$334	
2008-10-03	107 FGM-148 anti-tank missiles, 20 launchers.	$29	
2008-10-03	Upgrade 4 E-2T to E-2K configuration (Hawkeye 2000 standard).	$250	
2008-10-03	30 AH-64E attack helicopters (including 17 AN/APG-78 Longbow radars) and associated spare parts, engineering support, training, etc. Also included 173 AIM-92 Stinger missiles, 1000 AGM-114L Hellfire II anti-tank missiles, 66 M299 Hellfire launchers, and 35 Stinger captive missiles (used for training).	$2,532	At the time, the AH-64E was designated the AH-64D Block III.

== Barack Obama (2009–2017) ==
Date	Arms	Value (million)	Note
2010-01-29	60 UH-60M Black Hawk helicopters with 120 T-700-GE-701D engines, etc.	$3,100	
2010-01-29	35 Multifunctional Information Distribution Systems Low Volume Terminals (MIDS/LVT-1), etc.	$340	
2010-01-29	2 Osprey-class mine hunting ships, incl. refurbishment and upgrade, etc.	$105	
2010-01-29	10 RTM-84L HARPOON BLOCK II Telemetry missiles; 2 ATM-84L HARPOON Block II Telemetry missiles, etc.	$37	
2010-01-29	114 Patriot Advanced Capability (PAC-3) missiles, 3 AN/MPQ-65 Radar Sets, 1 AN/MSQ-133 Information and Coordination Centrals, etc.	$2,810	
2011-09-21	Continuation of a pilot training program and logistics support for F-16 aircraft at Luke Air Force Base, Arizona	$500	
2011-09-21	Retrofit of 145 F-16A/B aircraft that includes sale of: 176 Active Electronically Scanned Array (AESA) radars, etc.	$5,300	
2011-09-21	a Foreign Military Sales Order II (FMSO II) to provide funds for blanket order requisitions, under the Cooperative Logistics Supply Agreement (CLSSA) for spare parts in support of F-16A/B, F-5E/F, C-130H, and Indigenous Defense Fighter aircraft.	$52	
2015-12-16	208 Javelin Guided Missiles, etc.	$57	
2015-12-16	4 Multifunctional Information Distribution Systems (MIDS) On Ship Low Volume Terminals (LVTs); 4 Command and Control Processor (C2P) units, etc.	$75	
2015-12-16	769 TOW 2B Aero, Radio Frequency (RF) Missiles (BGM-71F series)；14 TOW 2B Aero, Radio Frequency (RF) (BGM-71F-Series) Fly-to-Buy Missiles；46 Improved Target Acquisition System (ITAS)；4 ITAS spares, etc.	$268	
2015-12-16	13 MK 15 Phalanx Block lB Baseline 2 Close-in Weapons System (CIWS) Guns; 8 CIWS Block 1 Baseline 0 to Block 1B Baseline 2 upgrade kits; 260,000 rounds of 20 mm MK 244 MOD 0 Armour-Piercing Discarding Sabots (APDS)	$416	
2015-12-16	The sale, refurbishment, and upgrade of 2 Oliver Hazard Perry-class frigates (FFG-7) being provided as Excess Defense Articles (EDA).	$190	
2015-12-16	250 Block I -92F MANPAD Stinger Missiles; 4 Block I -92F MANPAD Stinger Fly-to-Buy Missiles, etc.	$217	
2015-12-16	36 Assault Amphibious Vehicles (AAVs); 30 .50 Caliber M2 machine guns; 6 7.62mm M240 machine guns	$375	
2015-12-16	Follow-on life cycle support to maintain the Multifunctional Information Distribution Systems Low Volume Terminals (MIDS/LVT-1) & Joint Tactical Information Distribution Systems (JTIDS).	$120	
2015-12-16	unspecified minesweepers in a direct commercial sale	$108	

== Donald Trump (2017–2021) ==
Date	Arms	Value (million)	Note
2017-06-29	16 Standard Missile-2 Block IIIA (RIM-66K) All-Up Rounds (AUR), 47 Mk-93 Mod 1 SM-2 Block IIIA Guidance Sections (GSs), 5 Mk-45 Mod 14 SM-2 Block IIIA Target Detecting Devices (TDDs) Shrouds, 17 Mk-11 Mod 6 SM-2 Block IIIA Autopilot Battery Units (APBUs) maneuverability upgrades on the GSs, 69 section containers, 16 AUR containers, operator manuals and technical documentation, U.S. Government and contractor engineering, technical and logistics support services.	$125	
2017-06-29	168 Mk 54 Lightweight Torpedo (LWTs) conversion kits, including containers, support, spare parts, publications, training, weapon system support, engineering and technical assistance for the upgrade and conversion of 168 Mk-46 Mod 5 torpedoes to the Mk-54 LWT configuration.	$175	
2017-06-29	46 Mk-48 Mod6 AT heavyweight torpedoes (HWT), including containers, support, spare parts, publications, training, weapon system support, engineering and technical assistance.	$250	
2017-06-29	upgrade the AN/SLQ-32(V)3 Electronic Warfare Systems in support of 4 ex-Kidd-class (now Keelung-class) destroyers, including hardware and software upgrade, support equipment and parts, publications, training, engineering and technical assistance.	$80	
2017-06-29	56 AGM-154C JSOW air-to-ground missiles. This request also includes: JSOW integration, captive flight vehicles, dummy training missiles, missile containers, spare and repair parts, support and test equipment, Joint Mission Planning System updates, publications and technical documentation, personnel training and training equipment, U.S. Government and contractor engineering, technical and logistics support services, and other related elements of logistical and program support.	$185.5	
2017-06-29	50 AGM-88B HARMs and 10 AGM-88B Training HARMs. This request also includes: HARM integration, LAU-l 18A Launchers, missile containers, spare and repair parts, support and test equipment, Joint Mission Planning System update, publications and technical documentation, personnel training and training equipment, U.S. Government and contractor engineering, technical and logistics support services, and other related elements of logistical and program support.	$147.5	
2017-06-29	SRP (AN/FPS-115) Operations and Maintenance follow-on sustainment package that includes, contractor logistics support (sustainment); engineering services and technical updates to address equipment obsolescence; transportation and material costs associated with contractor repair and return services; spare and repair parts; support and test equipment; publications and technical documentation; personnel training and training equipment; U.S. Government and contractor engineering; technical and logistics support services; and other related elements of logistical and program support.	$400	
2018-09-24	Spare parts for F-16, C-130H, F-5E/F, Indigenous Defense Fighter (IDF), and other aircraft.	$330	
2019-04-15	Continuation of the pilot training program of 21st Fighter Squadron in Luke AFB, Arizona.	$500	
2019-07-08	250 FIM-92F man-portable missiles, 108 launchers, 31 trainers.	$223.56	
2019-07-08	108 M1A2T main battle tanks, 14 M88 recovery vehicles, 16 M1070A1 transporters, 16 M1000 trailers, ammunition.	$2,000	
2019-08-20	66 F-16V block 70 multi-role fighters, 75 F110 engines, 75 Link 16 systems, 75 AN/APG-83 AESA radars, 120 AN/ALE-50 towed decoy systems, ammunition.	$8,000	
2020-05-20	18 Mk-48 Mod6 AT heavyweight submarine-launched wire-guided torpedoes (HWT), including spare parts, support and test equipment, operator manuals, technical documentation, training.	$180	
2020-07-09	Repair and Recertification of MIM-104F (PAC-3) surface-to-air missile, supporting an operational life of thirty years.	$620	
2020-10-22	6 MS-110 multispectral airborne reconnaissance pods, 3 Transportable ground stations, 1 fixed Ground station, including spare parts, support and test equipment, operator manuals, technical documentation, training.	$367.2	
2020-10-22	135 AGM-84H standoff land attack missile expanded response (SLAM-ER) missiles, 4 ATM-84H SLAM-ER telemetry missiles, and 12 CATM-84H captive air training missiles (CATM), including 151 containers, spare parts, support and test equipment, operator manuals, technical documentation, training.	$1,008	
2020-10-22	11 M142 high mobility artillery rocket systems (HIMARS) launchers, 64 MGM-168 Army Tactical Missile Systems (ATACMS) M57 Unitary Missiles, including spare parts, support and test equipment, operator manuals, technical documentation, training.	$436.1	
2020-10-26	100 Harpoon Coastal Defense Systems (HCDS) consisting of up to four hundred 400 RGM-84L-4 Harpoon Block II Surface Launched Missiles; and four 4 RTM-84L-4 Harpoon Block II Exercise Missiles. Also included are four hundred and eleven 411 containers, 100 Harpoon Coastal Defense System Launcher Transporter Units, 25 radar trucks, spare and repair parts, support and test equipment.	$2,370	
2020-11-03	4 Weapons-Ready MQ-9B Remotely Piloted Aircraft; 2 Fixed Ground Control Stations; 2 Mobile Ground Control Stations; and 14 Embedded Global Positioning System/Inertial Navigations Systems (EGI) with Selective Availability Anti-Spoofing Module (SAASM).	$600	
2020-12-07	Field Information Communications System (FICS), consisting of 154 Communications Nodes (CN) with S-788 Type III shelter; 24 Communication Relays with S-788 Type III shelter; 8 Network Management Systems (NMS) with S-788 Type III shelter.	$280	

== Joe Biden (2021–2025) ==
Date	Arms	Value (million)	Note
2021-08-04	40 155mm M109A6 Paladin Medium Self-Propelled Howitzer System and related equipment.	$750	Order cancelled in favor of 18 additional M142 in 2022.
2022-02-07	Patriot International Engineering Services Program and Field Surveillance Program.	$100	
2022-04-05	Patriot Contractor Technical Assistance.	$95	
2022-06-08	Ship Spare Parts, Ship System Spare Parts.	$120	
2022-07-15	Contractor Technical Assistance Support.	$108	
2022-09-02	Contract Logistics Support for the Surveillance Radar Program.	$665.4	
2022-09-02	AGM-84L-1 Harpoon Block II Missiles.	$355	
2022-09-02	AIM-9X Block II Sidewinder Missiles.	$85.6	
2022-12-06	Aircraft standard spare parts.	$330	
2022-12-06	Aircraft non-standard spare parts.	$98	
2022-12-28	Volcano (vehicle-launched) anti-tank munition-laying systems.	$180	
2023-03-01	100 AGM-88B HARM; 23 HARM training missiles; 200 AIM-120C-8 AMRAAM; 4 AIM-120C-8 AMRAAM Guidance Sections	$619	
2023-06-29	Spare and repair parts for wheeled vehicles, weapons.	$108	
2023-06-29	30 mm ammunition and technical assistance, meant to supply CM-32 armoured vehicle.	$332.2	
2023-08-23	Infrared search and track system for F-16.	$500	
2023-12-15	Command, Control, Communications, and Computers (C4) Life Cycle Support and related equipment	$300	
2024-02-21	Advanced Tactical Data Link System Upgrade Planning	$75	
2024-06-05	F-16 Standard and Non-Standard Spare and Repair Parts	$300	
2024-06-18	720 Switchblade 300	$60.2	
2024-06-18	291 ALTIUS 600M-V	$300	
2024-09-16	Spare parts for aircraft and related equipment	$228	
2024-10-25	3 National Advanced Surface-to-Air Missile Systems	$1,160	
2024-10-25	AN/TPS-77 and AN/TPS-78 radar systems	$828	

== Donald Trump (2025–present) ==
Date	Arms	Value (million)	Note
2025-11-13	Non-Standard Spare and Repair Parts and related equipment for F-16, C-130, and Indigenous Defense Fighter (IDF) aircraft	$330	
2025-12-17	ALTIUS-700M and ALTIUS-600 Systems	$1100	
2025-12-17	Harpoon Missile Repair Follow-on Support	$91.4	
2025-12-17	1,050 Javelin Missile System	$375	
2025-12-17	1,545 Tube-launched, Optically tracked, Wire-guided missile system	$353	
2025-12-17	82 M142 High Mobility Artillery Rocket Systems (HIMARS), 420 M57 Army Tactical Missile System (ATACMS), 756 M31A2 Guided Multiple Launch Rocket System-Unitary pods (GMLRS-U), 447 M30A2 Guided Multiple Launch Rocket System-Alternative Warhead pods (GMLRS-AW)	$4050	
2025-12-17	60 M109A7 Self-Propelled Howitzers, 60 M992A3 Carrier Ammunition Tracked (CAT) Vehicles, 13 M88A2 Recovery Vehicles (RV), 4,080 Precision Guidance Kits (PGK), and 42 International Field Artillery Tactical Data Systems (IFATDS)	$4030	
2025-12-17	AH-1W Helicopter Spare and Repair Parts	$96	
2025-12-17	Tactical Mission Network Software	$1010	
