= NATO Programming Centre =

Component of the NATO Communications and Information Agency

The NATO Programming Centre (NPC) was an entity part of the NATO Communications and Information Agency (NCIA), responsible for system support and maintenance of the Air Command and Control Systems (Air C2).

The centre was located in Glons, a village close to the cities of Tongeren and Liège, Belgium. At its peak, it employed nearly 200 people. It was an integral part of the NCIA's Air C2 Programme Office and Services, previously known as NATO ACCS Management Agency (NACMA) for the ACCS Programme and with the NATO Support Agency (NSPA) for the maintenance of various Air Command and Control systems.

It was decommissioned at some point during 2022 or 2023. Today, the site is a camp for refugees and asylum seekers.
