= TADIL-J =

J-series message standard for Link 16 tactical data links

TADIL-J (Tactical Digital Information Link – J) refers to the standardized J-series message formats used in the Link 16 tactical data link network. These messages are defined by MIL-STD-6016 and, for NATO use, by STANAG 5516. TADIL-J is used by the United States Navy, United States Army, United States Marine Corps, United States Air Force, United States Coast Guard, the NSA, NATO member nations, and Japan as part of the Multi-Tactical Data Link Network (MTN).

TADIL-J was designed to exchange near real-time tactical information and serves as a communication, navigation, and identification (CNI) system supporting information exchange between command, control, communications, computers, and intelligence systems. The term "TADIL" has been officially retired by DISA in favour of the generic term Tactical Data Link (TDL), but "TADIL-J" remains in common use.

J-series messages can be carried over the JTIDS/MIDS radio waveform, or over alternative bearers including IP-based networks (JREAP, MIL-STD-3011), satellite links (S-TADIL J), and the NATO SIMPLE protocol.

== Background and standards ==
The J-series message standard emerged from the development of the Joint Tactical Information Distribution System (JTIDS) in the 1970s. The message formats and network procedures are jointly specified by MIL-STD-6016 (US) and STANAG 5516 (NATO); these documents are functionally equivalent but are distributed separately under their respective national and allied release processes. MIL-STD-6016 carries Distribution Restriction C (US federal government and contractors only); allied releases of STANAG 5516 require foreign disclosure authorisation from the United States.

The configuration management authority for MIL-STD-6016 is the Defense Information Systems Agency (DISA), with the lead US Air Force command being the Air Force Global Cyberspace Integration Center at Langley Air Force Base.

== Physical and link layer ==
=== Radio bearer ===
When carried over JTIDS/MIDS terminals, TADIL-J uses a frequency-hopping spread spectrum waveform operating in the L-band between 960 and 1,215 MHz, pseudo-randomly selecting among 51 centre frequencies per transmission. This band is allocated by the ITU to the aeronautical radionavigation service; JTIDS/MIDS operates on a non-interference basis. Transmissions are inhibited around the IFF frequencies of 1,030 and 1,090 MHz.

=== TDMA slot structure ===
TADIL-J uses Time Division Multiple Access (TDMA) to share network capacity among participants. The fundamental structure is:

Parameter	Value
Time slots per second	128
Slot duration	7.8125 ms
Time slots per epoch	98,304
Epoch duration	12.8 minutes
Epochs per 24 hours	112.5

Time slots are organised into three interleaved sets (A, B, C). Groups of time slots assigned to a common function are called Network Participation Groups (NPGs). Because TDMA eliminates the need for a net control station, TADIL-J networks have a nodeless architecture.

=== Message word format ===
Each TADIL-J transmission consists of a header and a variable number of message words:

- Header: 35 bits (padded to 48 bits for transmission), containing the time slot assignment, transmission security parameters, and message count.
- Message word: 75 bits (padded to 80 bits), the fundamental unit of TADIL-J data. One or more words form a complete message.

=== Packing modes ===
Multiple message words may be packed into a single time slot. The main packing modes are:

Mode	Words per slot	Notes
STD-1	1	Standard single-word transmission
STD-2	2	Standard double-word transmission
PACK-4 Single Pulse	Up to 12	High-density packing; requires Enhanced Throughput (ET) capable terminal
PACK-4 Double Pulse	Up to 12	Extended range variant of PACK-4

=== Data rates ===
TADIL-J supports three standard data rates: 31.6, 57.6, and 115.2 kbit/s. The underlying FHSS waveform can in principle support throughput values exceeding 1 Mbit/s; Enhanced Throughput (ET) modes approach this in practice.

== J-series message structure ==
=== Label and sublabel ===
Each J-series message is identified by a label (integer, J0 through J31) and a sublabel (integer suffix), written in the form Jlabel.sublabel — for example, J2.2 denotes label 2, sublabel 2. The label identifies the functional category; the sublabel identifies the specific message type within that category.

The full message type space encompasses labels J0 through J31, organised into the following broad functional categories:

Label range	Functional category
J0.x	Network management
J1.x	Network management (continued)
J2.x	Precise Participant Location and Identification (PPLI)
J3.x	Surveillance — air, surface, land, subsurface tracks
J4–J5.x	Anti-air warfare / weapons coordination
J6.x	Intelligence
J7.x	Information management / filtering
J8–J9.x	Electronic warfare
J10–J12.x	Control (air control, fighter-to-fighter)
J13–J14.x	Platform and system status
J15–J17.x	Threat warning and engagement status
J28.x	Free text (voice and data)
J31.x	No statement (padding)

=== Selected message types ===
The following messages are among those best documented in open sources:

Message	Name	Function
J0.0	Initial Entry	Network entry and synchronisation request
J0.1	Round Trip Timing A	Network time synchronisation (interrogation)
J0.2	Round Trip Timing B	Network time synchronisation (response)
J0.3	Network Time Reference	Broadcast of authoritative network time
J2.0	PPLI — reference point	Position/identity of a fixed reference
J2.2	PPLI — air	Position, velocity, identity of an airborne participant
J2.3	PPLI — surface	Position, identity of a surface (naval) participant
J2.4	PPLI — subsurface	Position, identity of a subsurface participant
J2.5	PPLI — land point	Position, identity of a land-based unit
J3.0	Surveillance — reference point	Fixed reference track
J3.1	Surveillance — air track	Air contact track data
J3.2	Surveillance — surface track	Surface contact track data
J3.3	Surveillance — subsurface track	Subsurface contact track data
J3.5	Surveillance — land track	Land unit track data
J7.0	Track management	Track correlation and management
J28.0	Free text	Free-format text message
J31.0	No statement	Null message; used for slot padding

== Network Participation Groups ==
A Network Participation Group (NPG) is a logical grouping of time slots assigned to a specific tactical function. Platforms subscribe to NPGs according to their role. The principal NPGs are:

NPG	Name	Primary message types	Notes
1	Initial Entry	J0.0, J0.1, J0.2, J0.3	Network entry and time synchronisation
2	Round Trip Timing	J0.1, J0.2	Fine time synchronisation
3	Time Slot Reallocation	J1.x	Dynamic network capacity management
4	Network Management	J1.x	Network health and control
5	PPLI — Air	J2.2	Airborne participants broadcast position/identity
6	PPLI — Surface/Land/Subsurface	J2.3, J2.4, J2.5	Non-air participants broadcast position/identity
7	Surveillance	J3.x	Track reports for air, surface, land, subsurface contacts
8	Mission Management / Weapons Coordination	J4.x, J5.x	Engagement coordination and weapons assignment
9	Aircraft Control	J10.x, J12.x	Ground-controlled intercept, fighter-to-fighter control
10	Electronic Warfare	J8.x, J9.x	EW data, jamming reports, emitter tracks
11	PPLI — Air Amplification	J2.2	Extended PPLI data for air participants
12	Surveillance Amplification	J3.x	Extended track data
13	Fighter-to-Fighter	J10.3	Direct air-to-air data exchange
14	Intelligence	J6.x	Intelligence data exchange
17	Voice A	J28.x	Digital voice channel A (2.4 or 16 kbit/s)
18	Voice B	J28.x	Digital voice channel B
19	Composite Warfare	J3.x, J7.x	Combined surveillance and management
20	Engagement Status	J15.x	Weapons status and engagement reporting
23	Precise Participant Location — Land	J2.5	Land force PPLI
27	Data Transfer	J28.x	File and imagery transfer
29	PPLI — Subsurface	J2.4	Submarine PPLI

== Bearer independence ==
The J-series message schema is architecturally separable from the JTIDS/MIDS radio bearer. The physical and link layers — TDMA timing, frequency-hopping spread spectrum, and TSEC/MSEC cryptography — constitute one implementation of TADIL-J, but the message formats themselves can be carried over any sufficiently capable transport.

This separation is formalised in several standards. MIL-STD-3011 / STANAG 5518 (JREAP) encapsulates J-series messages for transmission over satellite links and IP networks; JREAP C in particular uses UDP/TCP, making J-series messages exchangeable over any IP infrastructure. STANAG 5602 (SIMPLE) provides an analogous mechanism for IP-based simulation and test environments.

TADIL-J messages can be carried over:

- JTIDS/MIDS — the primary airborne/naval/ground radio waveform (960–1,215 MHz, FHSS/TDMA)
- JREAP (MIL-STD-3011) — encapsulation over IP networks (JREAP-C), serial links (JREAP-A, JREAP-B), or satellite; used to extend Link 16 beyond radio line of sight
- S-TADIL J — satellite relay of J-series traffic
- STANAG 5602 (SIMPLE) — NATO standard for J-series exchange in simulation and gateway environments
- MTC (Multi-TADIL Capability) — Serial-J or Socket-J; minimalist encapsulation used by the Global Command and Control System (GCCS)

This bearer independence means that J-series formatted messages can be exchanged between platforms that do not share the JTIDS/MIDS waveform, provided they share a common transport and a gateway or relay node. The J-series data model is therefore separable from the export-controlled radio and cryptographic architecture of JTIDS/MIDS.

The gateway concept extends bearer independence to coalition interoperability. A gateway node receives J-series traffic on one bearer or protocol, translates or re-encapsulates it, and forwards it on another — enabling platforms that cannot participate directly in a JTIDS network (due to export restrictions, terminal availability, or bandwidth constraints) to nonetheless share a common tactical picture with Link 16-equipped forces. Gateway products handling translation between Link 16, JREAP, VMF, and other TDLs are fielded by several defence integrators, including Curtiss-Wright (TCG HUNTR), Northrop Grumman (Gateway Manager), and CS Group (DIGINEXT product line).

== Change of terminology ==
TADIL is no longer an official US Department of Defense term (per DISA guidance). Instead it has officially been replaced by the generic term Tactical Data Link (TDL). However, the term "TADIL" is a legacy holdover and still used in the vernacular.

== Access restrictions ==
MIL-STD-6016 and STANAG 5516 are not publicly available. MIL-STD-6016 carries Distribution Restriction C, limiting access to US federal government personnel and contractors; access for federal contractors requires a government point of contact with ASSIST system access. All allied releases of STANAG 5516 require a foreign disclosure authorisation from the United States Department of State, regardless of the requesting nation's NATO membership status.

This access regime has practical consequences for interoperability: developers of simulation systems, gateways, and non-MIDS radio implementations that need to carry J-series messages cannot access the normative field-level specifications through open channels.

== See also ==
- Link 16
- JTIDS
- Multifunctional Information Distribution System
- JREAP
- Link 22
- Tactical data link
- STANAG 5602
