= Link-17 =

Pakistani military tactical data link system

Link-17 is an indigenous military tactical data link developed and used by the Pakistan Air Force. Link-17 enables Pakistan's fighter aircraft, AWACS, ground radars, and other sensor nodes to network and exchange targeting information in near real-time. It was created to network Pakistan's Chinese, Western, and domestic platforms without having to rely on a foreign-controlled data link system. A successor to the system called Link-17 Skyguard has since been developed by NASTP as an improvement over the original Link-17.

== Technical characteristics ==
Technical characteristics of the Link-17 have not been made public however open source analysis suggests that it is based on software-defined radio (SDR) technology and that it uses TDMA based structure with rapid frequency-hopping spread spectrum which gives it low probability of intercept and detection characteristics. It also features encrypted messaging with standardized message sets for track data, weapons coordination, and text or voice traffic. PAF's Erieye AWACS is the main sensor and coordinator node. It fuses tracking data from different sources and paints a shared air picture, and its broadside detection range is cited at around 450km. Several aspects of Link-17 such as frequency band, data throughput, message catalogue, SATCOM capability are still not public.

Link-17 also has the capability to interoperate with Link-Green of Pakistan Navy.

== See also ==
- C4ISR
- Link-16
- Link-ZA
