= Airborne Networking =

An Airborne Network (AN) is the infrastructure owned by the United States Air Force that provides communication transport services through at least one node that is on a platform capable of flight.

== Background ==
=== Definition ===
The intent of the US Air Force's Airborne Network is to expand the Global Information Grid (GIG) to connect the three major domains of warfare: Air, Space, and Terrestrial. The Transformational Satellite Communications System network currently provides connectivity for all communication through space assets. The Combat Information Transport System and Theater Deployable Communications provide terrestrial connectivity for theatre based operations. The Airborne Network is engineered to utilize all airborne assets to connect with space and surface networks building a seamless communications platform across all domains.

=== Capabilities ===
The capabilities identified by this type of system are vastly beyond that of our current military. This system will enable the Air Force to provide a transportable network, flexible enough to communicate with any air, space, or ground asset in the area. The network will provide a beyond line-of-sight (LoS) communications infrastructure that can be packed up and moved in and out of the designated battlespace, enabling the military to have a reliable and secure communications network that extends globally. The network is designed to be flexible enough to provide the right communication and network packages for a specific region, mission, or technology.

Operationally, The AN is designed to be self-forming, self-organizing, and self-generating, with nodes joining and leaving the network as they enter and exit a specific region. The network consists of dedicated tactical links, wideband air-to-air links, and ad hoc networks constructed by the Joint Tactical Radio System (JTRS) networking services. JTRS is a software-defined radio that will work with many existing military and civilian radios. It includes integrated encryption and Wideband Networking Software to create mobile ad hoc networks. It also provides system performance analysis and fault diagnostics automatically, reducing the demand for human intervention and network maintenance.

=== Intended Use ===
The AN was designed as the cornerstone for the new military doctrine known as Network Centric Warfare. This doctrine was developed to use information superiority to equip warfighters with more precise information enabling commanders and shooters to make smarter decisions faster. The AN contributes to Network Centric Warfare by enabling commanders to provide real-time information to warfighters in the air and on the ground. Warfighters can then utilize more information and make more educated decisions about how to act in a particular situation. Once the act has been carried out commanders will have immediate information about the result and can make judgments on how to continue. All-in-all the AN was designed to reduce the time necessary to identify a target, make clear and educated decisions to pull or not to pull the trigger, and assess battle

== Topologies ==
There are four main network topologies that will be deployed and vary based on the placement of backbone and subnet class networks.

=== Space, Air, Ground Tether ===
Establishing a direct connection to another aircraft or ground node, via a point-to-point link for nodes within LOS or via a Satellite Communications (SATCOM) link for nodes that are beyond line-of-sight is known as tethering. SATCOM links provide connectivity to a network ground entry point. Strike aircraft that accompany C2 aircraft such as an AWACS are tethered via point-to-point links. Finally, C2 or intelligence, surveillance, and reconnaissnce (ISR) aircraft may connect via a LOS link directly to a network ground entry point. Each of these tethered alternatives works exactly like a hub or switch that has an entry point to a larger network and allows their connected users access to that network.

=== Flat Ad Hoc ===
A flat ad hoc topology refers to establishing nonpersistent network connections as needed among AN nodes that are present at a given time. With this network the nodes dynamically “discover” other nodes to which they can interconnect and form the network. The specific interconnections between the nodes are not planned in advance, but are made as opportunities arise. The nodes join and leave the network at will, continually changing connections to neighbor nodes based upon their location and mobility characteristics.

=== Tiered Ad Hoc ===
Ad hoc networks can be flat in the sense that all nodes are peers of each other in a single network, as discussed above, or they can dynamically organize themselves into hierarchical tiers such that higher tiers are used to move data between more localized subnets. This network topology can be compared to any conventional deployed network that utilizes routers, switches, and hubs to temporarily connect users.

=== Persistent Backbone ===
A network topology characterized by a persistent backbone is established using relatively persistent wideband connections among high-value platforms flying relatively stable orbits. It provides the connectivity between the tactical subnets which are considered edge networks relative to the backbone. This provides concentration points for connectivity to the space backbone as well as to terrestrial networks. This type of network topology is comparable to a conventional permanent network with established data trunks, routers, switches, and hubs to connect users.

== Architecture ==
=== Network Management ===
The platform management system enables operators to manage all on-board network elements. It interfaces and interoperates with the Airborne Network management system to enable operators to manage remote network elements in the airborne network. The network management system monitors the health of the network by passively testing the network for faults and latency. The system will also actively troubleshoot faults with probes to identify and isolate faulty connections, and enables operators to apply network parameters and security changes to all systems based on the status of the network.

=== Routing/Switching ===
Routing and switching enables data to be dynamically transmitted over the network to other nodes. Routing protocols must be able to identify nodes transmitted within their own platform and data to be sent to other platforms regardless of the current topology. The routing protocol must also provide seamless roaming by ensuring that no routed packets are lost when a node changes its point of attachment to the network. Maintaining scalability is important in routing as the network is constantly changing. The network must be able to function with numerous levels of platforms, varying numbers of fast moving platforms, and varying amounts of traffic per platform. Routers and switches will use metrics to determine the best paths to take when routing data. The routing protocol utilized for the AN will be an Adaptive Quality of Service routing protocol.

=== Gateways/Proxies ===
Gateways and proxies enable the connection numerous technology types regardless of age to communicate across the IP-based network. Gateways and proxies are essential in the operation of this network because so many different technologies are used to communicate in each domain. These systems will facilitate the transition of the legacy on-board infrastructure, transmission systems, tactical data link systems, and user applications to the objective airborne network systems. Therefore, they are only temporary until all platforms use a standardized IP radio for transmission.

=== Performance Enhancing Proxies ===
Performance Enhancing Proxies improve the performance of user applications running across the Airborne Network by countering wireless network impairments, such as limited bandwidth, long delays, high loss rates, and disruptions in network connections. Proxy systems are implemented between the user application and the network and can be used to improve performance at the application and transport functional layers of the OSI model. Some techniques that can be employed include:

- Compression: Data compression or header compression can be used to minimize the number of bits sent over the network.
- Data bundling: Smaller data packets can be combined (bundled) into a single large packet for transmission over the network.
- Caching: A local cache can be used to save and provide data objects that are requested multiple times, reducing transmissions over the network (and improving response times).
- Store and forward: Message queuing can be used to ensure message delivery to users who become disconnected from the network or are unable to connect to the network for a period of time. Once the platform connects, the stored messages are sent.
- Pipelining: Rather than opening several separate network connections pipelining can be used to share a single network connection for multiple data transfers.
- Protocol streamlining: The number of transmissions to set up and take down connections and acknowledge receipt of data can be minimized through a combination of caching, spoofing, and batching.
- Translation: A translation can be performed to replace particular protocols or data formats with more efficient versions developed for wireless environments.
- Embedded acknowledgments: Acknowledgements can be embedded in the header of larger information carrying packets to reduce the number of packets traversing the network.

== Platform Categories ==
To categorize a specific airborne asset or class communications equipment all aircraft are divided into three main categories. These categories are determined by the types of missions the aircraft typically performs. The aircraft also fit into each category based on the type of equipment they can equip the airframe with. Each of the following sections outlines these three main categories.

=== Fighter Platforms ===
An airborne fighter platform flight profile includes periods of stable flight patterns and dynamic maneuvers at high speeds. Its relatively small size limits the amount of space available for mounting antennas and installing equipment. It will be employed as part of a strike package or combat air patrol (CAP). The strike package or CAP will have supporting airborne C2 and ISR platform(s), tanker (refueling) platform(s), and ground C2 platform(s). Each airborne fighter platform requires connectivity to all other strike package or CAP and supporting platforms; however, a majority of information will be exchanged between airborne fighter platforms. This is driven in large part by the need for frequent situational awareness and target sorting updates in a highly mobile environment. Pilots will be provided services such as real-time data, digital voice, and interactive data sharing.

Airborne fighter platforms will participate in both tethered and flat ad hoc network topologies. A tethered topology would primarily be used for reachback and forwarding between the airborne fighter platform and supporting elements. A flat ad hoc topology would be used between airborne fighter platforms in a strike package or CAP for the more frequent information exchanges. The figure outlines the minimum equipment requirements to support a fighter platform.

=== C4ISR Platforms ===
A C4ISR platform flight profile includes periods of en route flying and repeated, stable flight patterns. The relatively large size enables space available for mounting antennas and installing significant communications equipment to accommodate multiple mission crew functions. It will host up to three dozen mission crew members, including a communications operator. A C4ISR platform's mission applications and sensors will support multiple capabilities and mission types. Mission durations for any single aircraft and crew could range up to 12 hours; with aerial refueling it could be extended to 24 hours. These platforms often operate beyond line-of-sight of ground infrastructure and could be employed as a stand-alone or as part of a strike package or CAP in support of a strike package. C4ISR aircraft require a broad range of connection capability to connect peer-to-peer with other C4ISR aircraft or serve as a hub to connect fighter platform aircraft. The services provided by C4ISR aircraft include real-time data, voice, video, bulk data transfer, and interactive data.

C4ISR platforms will participate in both tethered and tiered ad hoc network topologies. A tethered topology would primarily be used for reachback and forwarding between the C4ISR platform, Ground Theater Air Control System, and strike package or CAP aircraft. A tiered ad hoc topology would be used between the C4ISR platform and airborne fighter platforms in a strike package or CAP. The figure outlines the minimum equipment requirements to implement the operations of a C4ISR platform.

=== Airborne Communications Relay Platforms ===
Airborne communications relay platform flight profile includes periods of en route flying and repeated, stable flight patterns. The relatively large size of widebodies theoretically enables space available for mounting antennas and installing significant communications equipment. UAVs offer long endurance and high altitude, which give wide area air and surface coverage and good optical paths to satellites. The mission of an airborne communications relay platform is to be employed as part of and/or support to C4ISR constellation and/or strike package(s) or CAP. The communications relay platform provides connectivity between elements of a strike package, CAP aircraft, C4ISR platforms, and Ground Theater Air Control System platforms that require range extension or internetworking and gateway functions between networks for information interoperability. The services necessary for communication relay platforms include real-time data transfer, voice, video, bulk data, and interactive data transfer.

Airborne communications relay platforms will participate in both tethered and tiered ad hoc network topologies. A tethered topology would primarily be used for reachback and forwarding between the C4ISR platform, Ground Theater Air Control System, and strike package or CAP aircraft. A tiered ad hoc topology would be used between the C4ISR platform and airborne fighter platforms in a strike package or CAP. The figure outlines the minimum equipment requirements to implement the operations of a communications relay platform.

== Challenges ==
=== Current Technology Restrictions ===
Many challenges lie ahead before the AN will exist as described in this document. Many of the challenges currently lie in the Legacy system avionics found on all aircraft. The biggest obstacle is a lack in bandwidth. Until more optics are integrated into aircraft systems, this system will lag in data transfer speeds and latency. One technology under research to resolve this problem is the Navy's research into highly integrated photonics to manage aircraft sensor suite communications. The technique runs radio frequencies over fiber optics and is currently being integrated into the EA-6B Prowler electronic warfare jet.

Security of this network is another huge obstacle. The goal is to give the system a low probability of jamming and interception. Many ideas of how to protect the system are being investigated and tested. Traditional methods of authentication and authorization are being used, to include biometrics, cryptographic tokens, and integrated Public Key Infrastructure.

=== Commercial Off-the-Shelf ===
Commercial off-the-shelf (COTS) creates extreme engineering challenges. While it offers flexibility in application and saves money in production it is incredibly difficult to adapt to various application. Getting COTS to install in applications it was not designed for continues to be a vast engineering challenge as military researchers work to integrate civilian L-3 radio and FPGA technology into reconnaissance aircraft designed in the 60s.

=== Bandwidth ===
Bandwidth to support the Air Force's AN does not currently exist. Only time can tell until enough bandwidth is freed up by obsolete technology. This creates the challenge of creating better ways of compressing data and developing more efficient ways to utilize the bandwidth currently available. One interim solution developed by Northrop Grumman is the Dialup rate IP over existing radios (DRIER). DRIER enables airborne or ground-based tactical users to select and download mission-critical data directly from the Joint STARS platform using existing, narrowband line-of-sight or beyond-line-of-sight UHF communications links. Users can also serve as a relay point, providing critical handover information between aircraft entering and exiting mission orbits.
