= Link-ZA =

Tactical data link system

Link-ZA (also "Link ZA" or "LinkZA") is a tactical data link system used by the South African National Defence Force. It is the data communication component of the "Combat Net Interoperability Standard" (CNIS). Development began in the early 1990s when South Africa acquired a wide variety of high technology defence equipment such as Saab JAS 39 Gripen fighter jets, BAE Hawk lead-in fighter trainers, Valour-class frigates and other weapons systems. Because South Africa was not able to acquire the NATO standard Link-16 system an indigenous system was developed.

== Features ==
Link-ZA is a multi-platform secure network protocol operating over HF, VHF or UHF radio or satellite link. It uses TDMA and CSMA to establish links and share data with up to 31 active nodes and an unlimited number of passive nodes. Static or dynamic routing tables are supported. Link-ZA node controllers have store and forward capability to transfer data between different radio nets. A node controller can access multiple radios and automatically select the most appropriate link.
