= JDN =

JDN can refer to:

- Julian Day Number, the continuous count of days since the beginning of the Julian period
- Joint Data Network, an interconnected network of JTIDS–based systems
- Just Dance Now, a video game in the Just Dance series developed and published by Ubisoft
