= Rate Based Satellite Control Protocol =

In computer networking, Rate Based Satellite Control Protocol (RBSCP) is a tunneling method proposed by Cisco to improve the performance of satellite network links with high latency and error rates.

The problem RBSCP addresses is that the long RTT on the link keeps TCP virtual circuits in slow start for a long time. This, in addition to the high loss give a very low amount of bandwidth on the channel. Since satellite links may be high-throughput, the overall link utilized may be below what is optimal from a technical and economic view.

== Means of operation ==
RBSCP works by tunneling the usual IP packets within IP packets. The transport protocol identifier is 199. On each end of the tunnel, routers buffer packets to utilize the link better. In addition to this, RBSCP tunnel routers:

- modify TCP options at connection setup.
- implement a Performance Enhancing Proxy (PEP) that resends lost packets on behalf of the client, so loss is not interpreted as congestion.
