= Multifunction Advanced Data Link =

Information-sharing communication link

Multifunction Advanced Data Link (MADL) is a fast switching narrow directional communications data link between stealth aircraft. It began as a method to coordinate between F-35 (the Joint Strike Fighter), but HQ Air Combat Command wants to expand the capability to coordinate future USAF strike forces of all AF stealth aircraft, including the B-2, F-22, and unmanned systems. MADL is expected to provide needed throughput, latency, frequency-hopping and anti-jamming capability with phased array antenna assemblies (AAAs) that send and receive tightly directed radio signals. MADL uses the Ku band.

The Office of the Undersecretary of Defense for Acquisition, Technology and Logistics directed the Air Force and Navy to integrate MADL among the F-22, F-35 and B-2, to one another and to the rest of network.

As of 2010, the Air Force has canceled upgrade plans for the F-22 to receive MADL citing technology maturity risks.

Critics contend that since Link 16 is the standard by which U.S. and Allied aircraft communicate, upgrades to Link-16 radios should be supported that can provide the same capabilities as MADL while maintaining interoperability.

The MADL could be used beyond a four-ship flight.

== Platforms ==
- The F-22 Raptor MADL upgrade was cancelled in 2010
- The F-35 Lightning II has MADL built in
- B-2 Spirit
- US Navy surface combatants with Baseline 9 Aegis Combat System can take targeting data from F-35s via MADL.
- E-7A Wedgetail

== See also ==
- Global Information Grid
- Link 16
- Multifunctional Information Distribution System
- Network-centric warfare
