= Glons =

Village in Wallonia, Belgium

Coordinates: 50°45′N 5°32′E

Glons (Walloon: Glon; Dutch: Glaaien) is a village of Wallonia and a district of the municipality of Bassenge, located in the province of Liège, Belgium.

Glons is a significant site in that it is the home of the NATO Programming Centre.

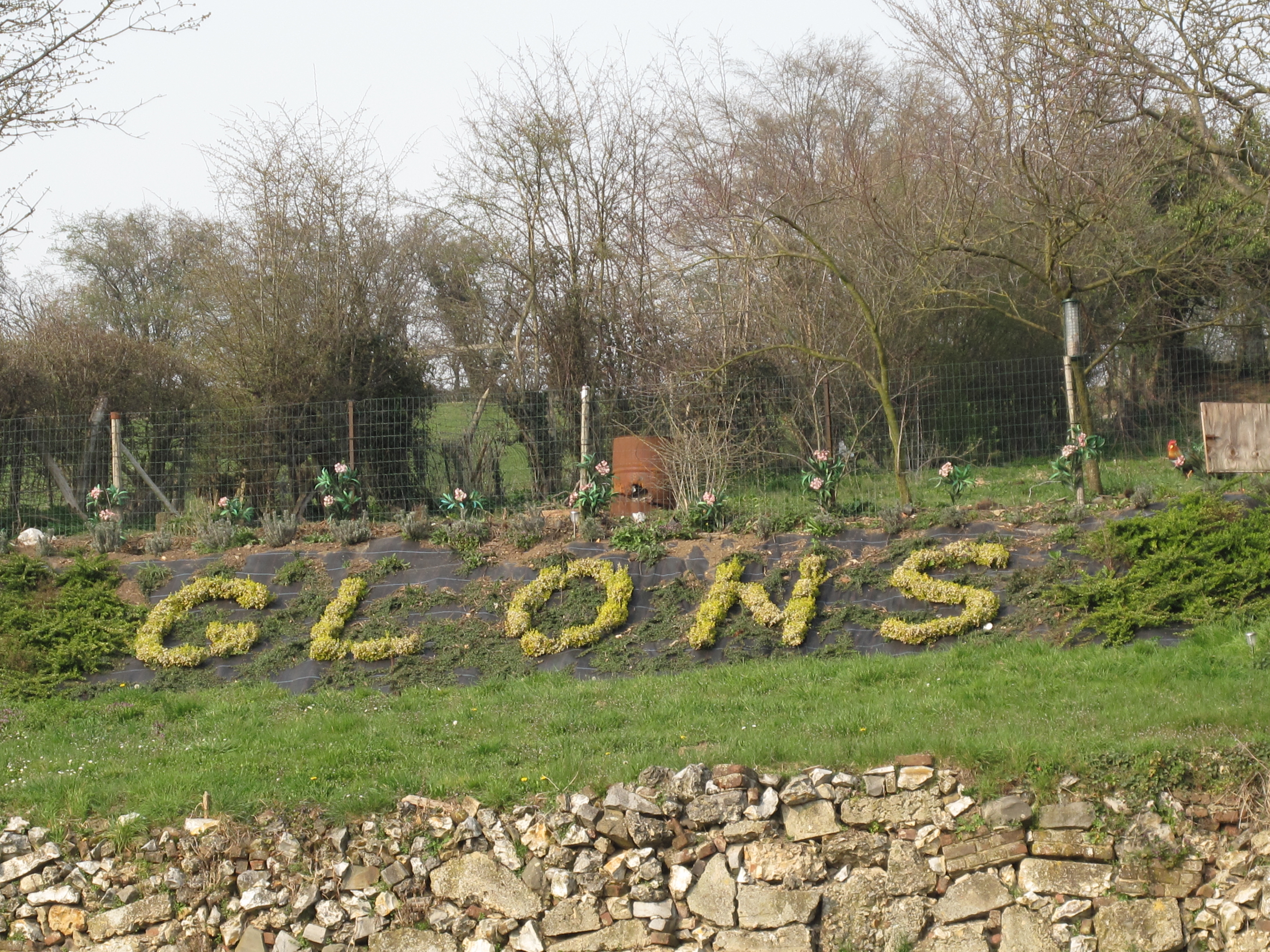
Glons in flowers

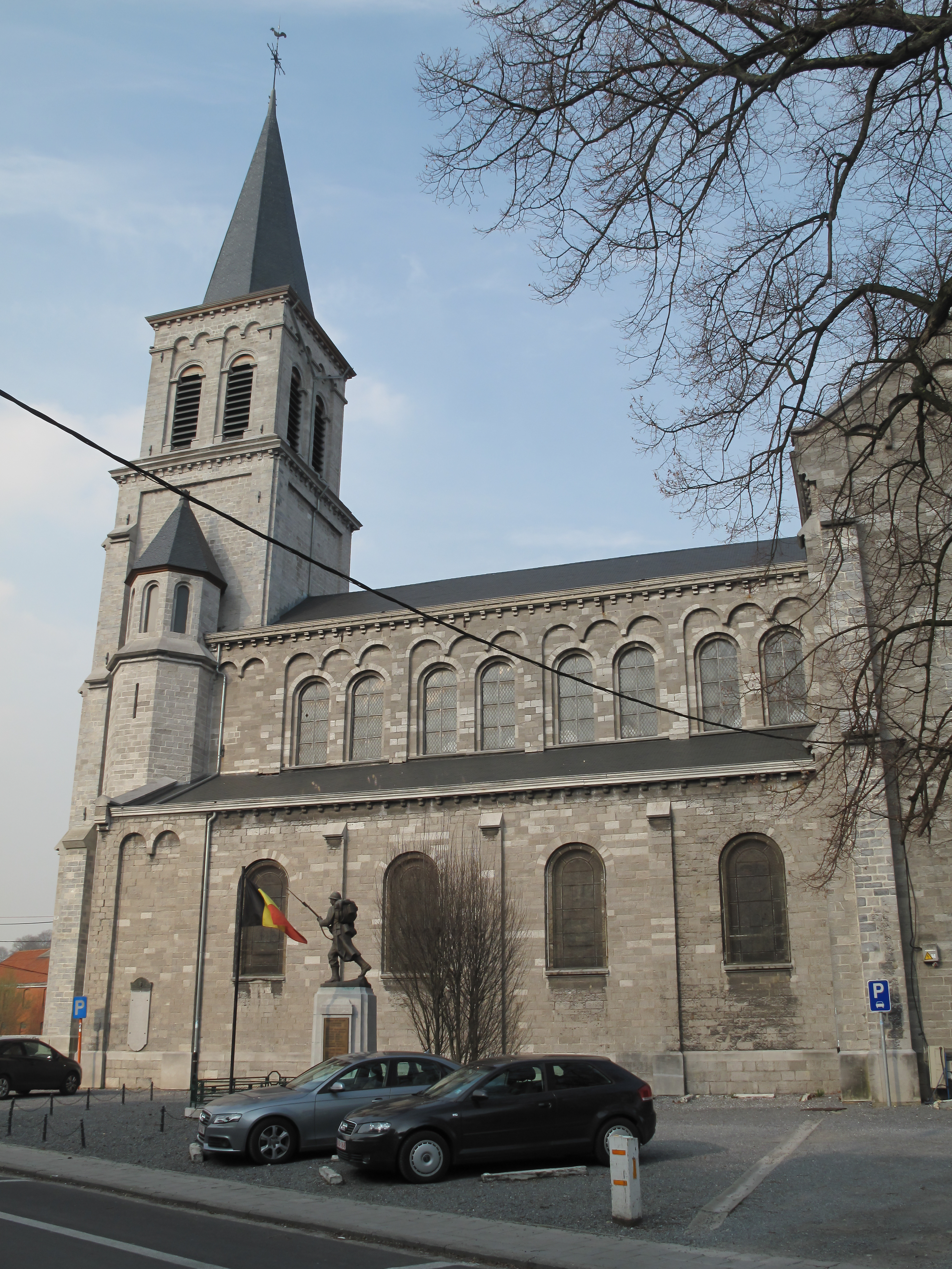
Glons, church of St. Victor
