= IGeoSIT =

Situational awareness tool developed by NATO

iGeoSIT, the Interim Geo-Spatial Intelligence Tool, is a situational awareness tool developed by the NATO Communications and Information Agency (NCIA) used widely within NATO.

iGeoSIT consists of a web-enabled Java server client and a central server, running Apache and Tomcat. When a NATO person enters the URL for an iGeoSIT server, it checks first to see if the user has a locally cached copy of the client, a mapping utility. If the local cache exists, the Java application is loaded. If it does not, the Apache server send the java client application. The Java on the server side runs on Tomcat with proposed plans to one day run on a newer Java engine.

iGeoSIT servers respond similarly as ArcGIS, and other GIS servers, to WMS requests. WMS requests are tcp/IP messages where the server instructions are contained within the URL request to the webserver. It will contain requests for data layers, opacity, and different base maps. The request is replied with a JPG image and a redirect if there is a live overlay, such as current positions of a patrol or aircraft.

iGeoSIT clients are used by analysts and operators to geospatially reference events or perform terrain analysis. For example, a units current location can be visually compared to a SQL response which contains the geospatial data point for a nearby military outpost. The Java tool has things like rulers to physically measure distance(s), or draw shapes for export to PowerPoint for a mission brief, or event log.
