= Joint Interoperability of Tactical Command and Control Systems =

Joint Interoperability of Tactical Command and Control Systems or JINTACCS is a program of the United States Department of Defense for the development and maintenance of tactical information exchange configuration items (CIs) and operational procedures. It was originated in 1977 to ensure that the command and control (C2 and C3) and weapons systems of all US military services and NATO forces would be compatible.

It is made up of standard Message Text Formats (MTF) for man-readable and machine-processable information, a core set of common warfighting symbols, and data link standards called Tactical Data Links (TDLs).

JINTACCS was initiated by the US Joint Chiefs of Staff in 1977 as a successor to the Joint Interoperability of Tactical Command and Control Systems in Support of Ground and Amphibious Military Operations (1971-1977). As of 1982 the command was hosted at Fort Monmouth in Monmouth County, New Jersey, and employed 39 military people and 23 civilians.
