= Data Link Solutions =

American military radio system company

Data Link Solutions (DLS) is a joint venture entity that was created in 1996 between GEC-Marconi Hazeltine (now known as BAE Systems) and Rockwell Collins for the purpose of developing, manufacturing and supporting the Joint Tactical Information Distribution System (JTIDS).

DLS is headquartered in Cedar Rapids, Iowa, and also has facilities in Wayne, New Jersey.

== Products ==
The company has the extensive contract experience in JTIDS Class 2 / 2H / 2M, the MIDS Fighter Data Link (FDL) and the MIDS Low Volume Terminal (LVT-1), with over $275 million in contracts to date and production deliveries started for MIDS LVT and FDL terminals.

In June 2006 Data Link Solutions (DLS) and Viasat entered into an agreement to cooperatively produce and sell Multifunctional Information Distribution System (MIDS) terminals for the Joint Tactical Radio System (JTRS). DLS is leading the development effort on MIDS JTRS under an $82 million product improvement program contract.

In August 2007 Data Link Solutions received a $28 million order for Multifunctional Information Distribution System-Low Volume Terminals (MIDS-LVT) from the Space and Naval Warfare Systems Command (SPAWAR) in San Diego. The terminals will be installed in the U.S. Navy F/A-18 and EA-6B, U.S. Air Force F-16, B-1, B-2 and B-52 as well as other battle elements.

On January 7, 2024, DLS was sanctioned by the Chinese government due to U.S. arms sales to Taiwan.
