= Joint Data Network =

US Military Command System

The Joint Data Network (JDN) is an interconnected network of JTIDS–based systems, which links air and missile defense command and control and weapons systems across United States armed forces. It provides a set of near-real-time data communications and information systems to facilitate situational awareness and the exchange and summary of Extended Air Defense engagement operations data (such as the Medium Extended Air Defense System) to centralized command centers, via inter-computer data and radio communications exchange protocols. JDN's backbone protocol is based on the NATO standard Link-16, although other data links and platforms are also integrated, or planned for integration.
