= Link 1 =

NATO computer network standard

Link 1 is a computer network standard developed by NATO to provide information exchange for air defence.

== General description ==
Link 1 is a point-to-point, duplex, non-encrypted, digital NATO Tactical Data Link (TDL) Standard for the automatic exchange of Track and Strobe data, combined with link and data management messages between ground based ASACS-elements / e.g. CRC and CAOC, specific units (TACCS / MC) and data link buffers (SSSB, CSI).

In everyday language, the different meaning of the wording Link 1 TDL Standard (format) and Link 1 information content (subject matter) to be transmitted on this particular TDL Standard is mixed up in many cases.

Remark:

- TACCS / MC = Tactical Air Command and Control Service / (NATO) Major Command)
- SSSB = Ship Shore Ship Buffer
- CSI = CRC/SAM Interface

SAM = Surface-to-air missile

== History ==
Link 1 is a NATO first Generation's TDL Standard. It was developed in the 1950s as pure Air Surveillance data link format in order to exchange radar track data between defined Areas of Responsibility – AOR (geographical areas) or Track Continuity Areas (TCA).

=== Data links first generation ===
NATO first generation's TDL Standards were developed in line with the appropriate Standardization Agreement (STANAG) in the mid 1960s. These proprietary types of data formats do not support direct data and information exchange between different military IT architectures without specific conversion of data.

NATO TDL Standards are being developed by the Data Link Working Group (DLWG) of the Information Systems Sub-Committee (ISSC). See also TDL Synopsis).

== Utilisation ==
Today the Link 1 TDL Standard is not only used by NATO nations but also in Partnership for Peace (PfP) countries. Air Force internal it supports NATO Air Defence Ground Environment (NADGE) and is used by the TACC Service, in CRC, CAOC and Air Defence.

== Types of tracks ==
The following tracks are exchanged by Link 1 between different users of the Recognized Air Picture (RAP).

- Ground Environment Tracks (GE Tracks):
  tracks, which have received their last position-update by a ground site. These are either local or remote.
- Airborne Early Warning Tracks (AEW Tracks):
  Tracks, which have received their last position-update by an AEW-platforms. These are always remote.
- GE / AEW Tracks:
  These Tracks are used as "Track Pairs" for registration purposes and are update by both the ground site and AEW.
- E-3A Tracks:
  The Tracks of an active E-3A, usually correlated with the received P-1 Message on IJMS.

== Messages ==
The following link messages are supported by Link 1 in the NATO Air Defense Ground Environment (NADGE):

- S0 – Test Message: Used to test the channel in order to exchange Link 1 data. The S0 is, on average, transmitted every 10 seconds.
- S3 – IFF/SIF Message: Use to transmit the IFF/SIF Mode 1, 2 and 3 on a specific Track. This Message is always associated with a S4 Basic Track Data Messages.
- S4 – Basic Track Data Message: Used to report the basic positional data of a track. The S4 is either associated with S3 or an S5 message.
- S5 – Expanded Track Data Message: Used in conjunction with S4 (or S8) to report the additional data of a track. The initial transmission of an S4 / S5 message combination initiates a new Track at the receiving Link 1 site.
- S6 – Weapon Assignment Message: Used to transmit weapon assignment S6 Messages.

== Specification ==
The NATO Link 1 TDL Standard is characterised by the specification as:

Link 1	Specification	Term
Reference		STANAG 5501 (Ed. 4) Jan 2007; NCGX-101-IS
Standardization level	NATO Data Link Standard	S-series-messages
Configuration's controlling		ADSC (Implementation); ADSIA (Standards)
Services concerned and TACC Systems		Air Force, Army; NADGE, national weapon management systems
Messages transmitted	1. surveillance (only air); 2. ECM-strobe-tell; 3. Info-management	
Message- format	2 messages/frame: 128 bits/frame; 49 infobits/message	fixed message format
Message Series		S-series
Number of Messages	6	
Speed of transmission	1200 bit/sec (basic speed); 600 or 2400 bit/sec (alternate speed)	
Communication	FSK, point-to-point	FOC, Wire, Radio relay
IT-Security	ECM; Encryption	NO; NO
Releasable to:	NATO; PfP nations; Internet	Yes; Yes; Yes

== Conclusion ==
Link 1, as a NATO 1st generation TDL Standard, is out of date and no longer meets operational requirements. Moreover, there is no IT security of information transmitted, as the result of no Electronic countermeasure (ECM) resistance and insufficient encryption. Although Link 1 became obsolete, it is still in operation.
