= NATO Communications and Information Agency =

Technology and cyber hub of NATO

- Industry: Defence, Space and Technology
- Predecessor: NATO C3 Organization; NATO Communication and Information Systems Services Agency (NCSA); NATO Consultation, Command and Control Agency (NC3A); NATO Air Command and Control System Management Agency (NACMA); NATO Headquarters Information and Communication Technology Service (ICTM); SHAPE Technical Centre
- Headquarters: Brussels, Belgium
- Number of locations: Four main campuses: Brussels, Mons, The Hague, Oeiras, and over 30 locations
- Key people: Dr. Dylan Browne (General Manager)
- Website: www.ncia.nato.int

The NATO Communications and Information Agency (NCI Agency) is NATO's technology and cyber hub.

The Agency provides C4ISR (Command, Control, Communications, and Computers, Intelligence, Surveillance, and Reconnaissance; refer to Command and control terminology) technology, including cyber and missile defence.

== Organization ==
The NCI Agency, led by the General Manager, is headquartered in Brussels, Belgium. The Agency is the executive arm of the NATO Communication and Information Organisation (NCIO).

NCIO is managed by an Agency Supervisory Board (ASB) composed of representative from each NATO member state. The ASB oversees the work of the NCIO. After consulting with the NATO Secretary General, NCIO's ASB appoints the General Manager of the Agency. All 32 NATO states are members of the NCIO.

The ASB, which reports to the North Atlantic Council (NAC), issues directives and makes general policy decisions to enable NCIO to carry out its work. Its decisions on fundamental issues such as policy, finance, organization and establishment require unanimous agreement by all member countries.

=== Evolution ===
At the Lisbon Summit in November 2010, NATO Heads of State and Government agreed to reform the 14 existing NATO Agencies, located in seven member states. In particular, Allies agreed to streamline the agencies into three major programmatic themes: procurement, support, and communications and information. The reform aims to enhance efficiency and effectiveness in the delivery of capabilities and services, to achieve greater synergy between similar functions and to increase transparency and accountability.

As part of the reform process, the NCI Agency was created on 1 July 2012 through the merger of the NATO C3 Organisation, NATO Communication and Information Systems Services Agency (NCSA), NATO Consultation, Command and Control Agency (NC3A), NATO Air Command and Control System Management Agency (NACMA), and NATO Headquarters Information and Communication Technology Service (ICTM).

== Management ==
The NCI Agency is led by the General Manager, Dr. Dylan Browne. Dr. Browne was appointed as General Manager of the agency, effective 12 December 2025, succeeding Mr. Ludwig Decamps.

== Location ==
The NATO Communications and Information Agency's (NCI Agency) has 4 main campuses located in the European Union – Brussels and Mons in Belgium, The Hague in The Netherlands, and Oeiras in Portugal. The NCI Agency has over 30 locations in Europe, North America and South-East Asia.

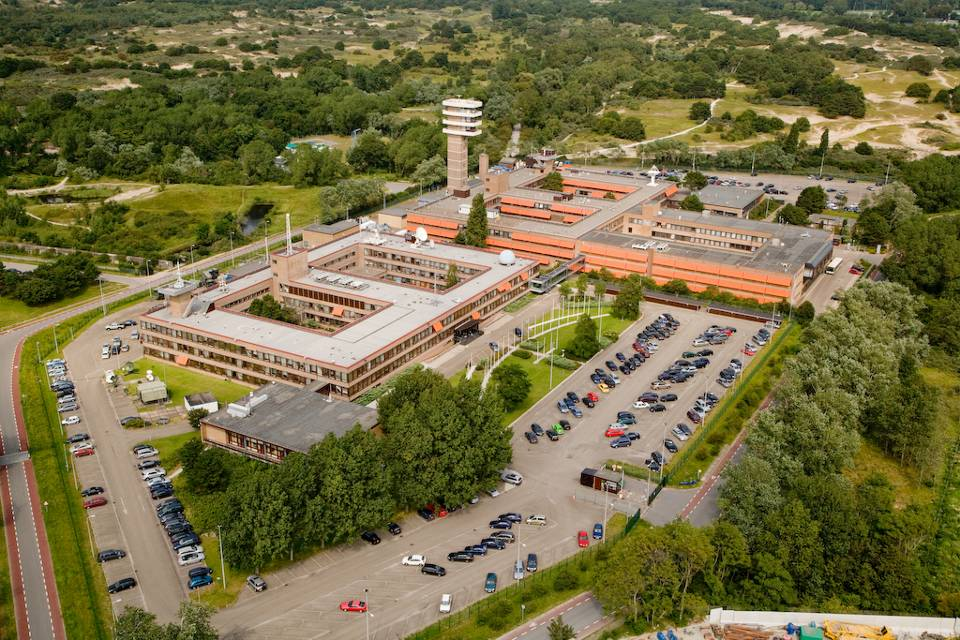
The NCI Agency campus in The Hague

== Services ==
The NCI Agency's area of expertise and key projects range from missile defense to secure desktops:

1. Command and Control services
  - Common Operational Picture tools for the land, maritime and air domains
  - Medical information and coordination system
2. Education and Training
3. Support to Exercises and Operations
4. Operational analysis, defence planning
5. Air and Missile Defence Command and Control
  - Air Command and Control System to conduct air policing and protect NATO European airspace
  - Ballistic Missile Defence
6. NATO's consultation and command networks
  - Core enterprise services for NATO entities and Nations
  - Federated Mission Networking for Forces
  - Modernization of NATO's IT
7. Joint Intelligence, Surveillance and Reconnaissance
  - Airborne IP chat capability for the AWACS aircraft
  - Secure satellite communications for Alliance Ground Surveillance
8. iGeoSIT
9. Cyber security services
  - NATO's cyber shield
  - NATO Computer Incident Response Capability
  - NATO Industry Cyber Partnership
  - NATO Rapid Reaction Team

== Success at Locked Shields ==
NATO, led by the NATO Communications and Information (NCI) Agency, won the world's largest live-fire cyber exercise, Locked Shields 2018 for the third consecutive year.
