= Protocol pipelining =

Non-pipelined vs. pipelined connection

Protocol pipelining is a technique in which multiple requests are written out to a single socket without waiting for the corresponding responses. Pipelining can be used in various application layer network protocols, like HTTP/1.1, SMTP and FTP.

The pipelining of requests results in a dramatic improvement in protocol performance, especially over high-latency connections (such as satellite Internet connections). Pipelining reduces waiting time of a process.

== See also ==
- HTTP pipelining
