= C4ISR =

C4ISR may refer to:

- the C4ISR concept of Command, Control, Communications, Computers, Intelligence, Surveillance and Reconnaissance, the U.S. term for C4ISTAR
- C4ISRNET, a trade publication from Sightline Media Group
- the C4ISR architectural framework (C4ISR AF), now known as Department of Defense Architecture Framework (DoDAF)

== See also ==
- Command and control
- RSTA
- STA sniper (USMC)
- Surveillance and Target Acquisition
- Artillery STA
- ISTAR
- Military intelligence
- Information warfare
- Programs include Command Post of the Future (CPOF), C2PC, FBCB2, and MCS
- Battlefield management system
