= Air Force Weapon Systems Command (Germany) =

Coordinates: 50.8603°N 7.1130°E

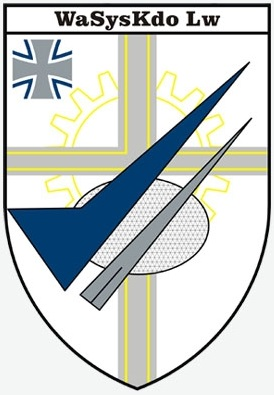
- Active: 2006–2013
- Country: Germany
- Branch: German Air Force
- Size: 1,270
- Part of: Air Force Office
- Headquarters: Cologne

Commanders
- Last commander: Brigadier General Rudolf Maus

The Air Force Weapon Systems Command (GAFWSC; German: Waffensystemkommando der Luftwaffe, WaSysKdoLw) was a German Air Force command authority of the division level, with the responsibility for air force logistics, armament, and in-service support controlling of the GAF material and airborne vehicles.

== See also ==
- Military organization
