= Recognized air picture =

A recognized air picture or RAP is a (theoretically) complete listing of all aircraft in flight within a particular airspace, with each aircraft being identified as friendly or hostile, and ideally containing additional information such as type of aircraft, flight number, and flight plan. The information may be drawn from a number of different sources, including military radar, civilian air traffic controllers, and allied nations or multi-national organizations such as NATO.

For the United States and Canada, the Recognized Air Picture is maintained continuously by NORAD at Peterson Air Force Base (with Cheyenne Mountain Complex as a warm standby). In the United Kingdom, it is maintained by the United Kingdom Combined Air Operations Centre at RAF Air Command at RAF High Wycombe. For the rest of Europe, NATO has an Air Command and Control System program underway to unify the various systems in use by NATO members throughout Europe.
