= Link 22 =

Military wireless data exchange standard

Link 22 is a secure digital radio link in the high frequency (HF) and ultra high frequency (UHF) bands, primarily used by military forces as a tactical data link.

Link 22 provides beyond line-of-sight (BLOS) communications. It interconnects air, surface, subsurface, and ground-based tactical data systems, and it is used for the exchange of tactical data among the military units of the participating nations. Link 22 will be deployed in peacetime, crisis, and war to support NATO and Allied warfare taskings.

The Link 22 program was initially conducted collaboratively by seven nations under the aegis of a memorandum of understanding (MOU). The original seven nations were Canada, France, Germany, Italy, the Netherlands, the United Kingdom (UK), and the United States (US), with the US acting as the host nation. Spain has replaced the Netherlands as a NILE (NATO Improved Link Eleven) nation.

Link 22 was developed to replace and overcome the known deficiencies of Link 11. Link 22 was also designed to complement and interoperate easily with Link 16. It was designed with automated and simple management to ensure that it is easier to manage than both Link 11 and Link 16. This program is called "NATO Improved Link Eleven", which is abbreviated to "NILE". The tactical data link provided by the NILE system has been officially designated Link 22.

== History ==
During the late 1980s, NATO, agreeing on the need to improve the performance of Link 11, produced a mission need statement that became the basis for the establishment of the NATO Improved Link Eleven (NILE) Program. This program specified a new tactical message standard in the NATO standardization agreement (STANAG) 5522 to enhance data exchange and provide a new layered communications architecture. This new data link was designated Link 22 by NATO.

The NILE program is funded and collaboratively conducted by seven nations under the aegis of a memorandum of understanding (MOU). A steering committee controls the complete NILE program. The program is managed by the Project Management Office (PMO), located at the Naval Information Warfare Systems Command (NAVWAR) Program Management Warfare (PMW) 150 in San Diego, California. The PMO consists of a representative from each participating nation and a Project Manager from the US.

The Link 22 goals are

- to replace Link 11, thereby removing the inherent limitations of Link 11;
- to improve Allied interoperability;
- to complement Link 16; and
- to enhance the commanders' war fighting capability.

From 2007 to 2009 NILE nation Germany contracted German industry to enhance performance and tactical capabilities for Link 22 HF fixed frequency (FF) operation. Three goals were achieved:

- increased robustness for the standardized data rates (defined by MSN 1-6)
- gapless communication range extended up to 1000 NM
- increased throughput by additional high-speed waveforms

In 2012, Germany submitted the new HF-FF (High Frequency-Fixed Frequency) technology to NATO and the NILE program, for ratification and adoption respectively. In 2015 the NILE program approved the adoption of the new HF-FF technology, with full support anticipated for 2016.

The Link 22 system is centered around its core component, the system network controller (SNC). This software exists as a single implementation, produced by the NILE PMO and owned by the NILE nations. To ensure compatibility across Link 22 implementations, all participants must use this SNC software. Each implementing nation will acquire this software and will implement it in a hardware environment suitable for its own application. Therefore, the SNC is not available as a commercial product, and is supplied by NILE PMO to NILE agreed Third-Party Sales nations with an annual maintenance fee.

An overview and introduction to Link 22 is provided by the "Link 22 Guidebook" published by the NILE PMO in July 2009. This Guidebook has been written in a manner that provides information for Link 22 operators, planners, managers, executives, developers, and testers. Given below is an abstract of chapter 1 of the Link 22 Guidebook. The other chapters 2-3 of the Link 22 Guidebook are only available to NILE and Third-Party Sales nations.
