= Multifunctional Information Distribution System =

Communication component of Link-16

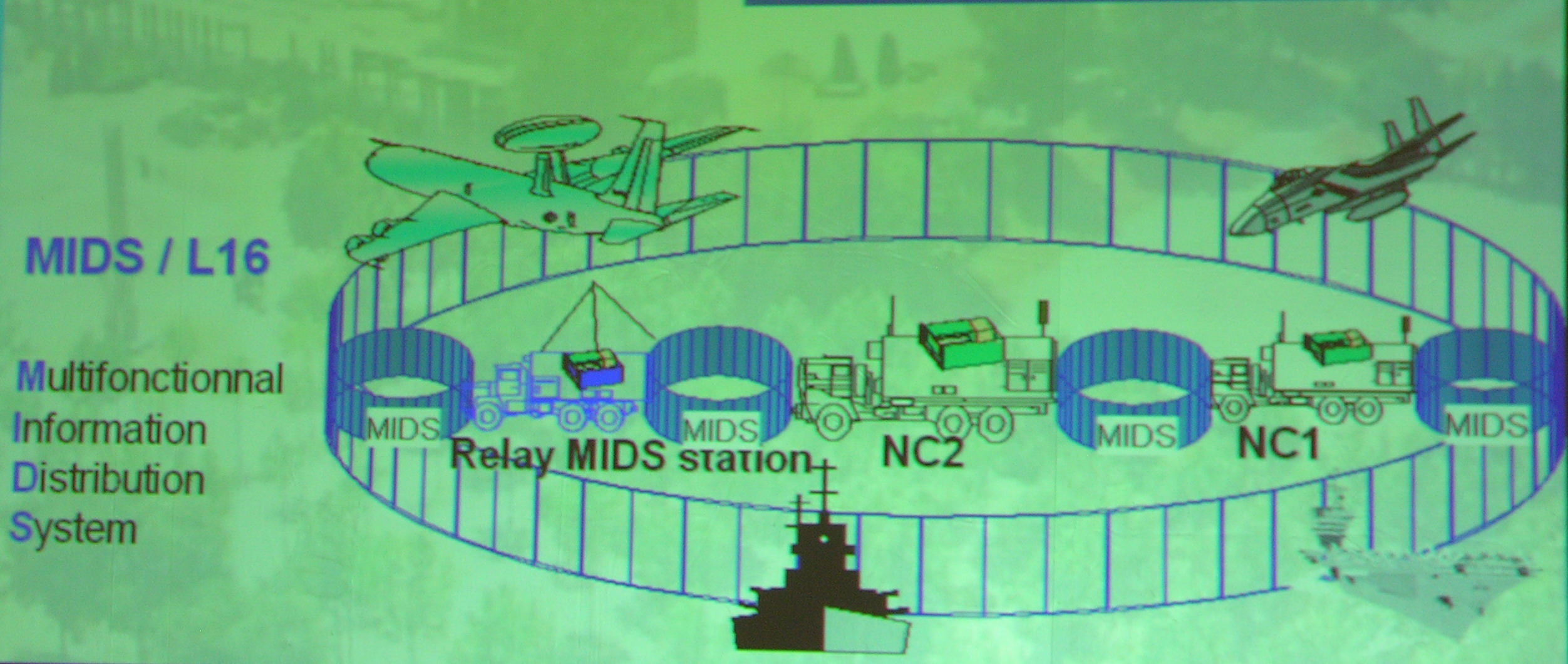

Multifunctional Information Distribution System (MIDS) is the NATO name for the communication component of Link-16 developed by Xetron.

MIDS is an advanced command, control, communications, computing and intelligence (C4I) system incorporating high-capacity, jam-resistant, digital communication links for exchange of near real-time tactical information, including both data and voice, among air, ground, and sea elements. MIDS is intended to support key theater functions such as surveillance, identification, air control, weapons engagement coordination and direction for all services.

The MIDS program includes two different families of receiver synthesizer line cards:

- MIDS-LVT (Low volume terminal): LVT(1), LVT(2), or LVT(3).
- MIDS-JTRS (Joint Tactical Radio System Terminals). MIDS-JTRS is a software-defined radio (SDR) that is compliant with the JTRS Software Communication Architecture (SCA) . MIDS JTRS maintains the Link-16, J-Voice, and TACAN functionality of the older MIDS-LVT standard, and adds link-16 enhanced throughput (ET), link-16 frequency remapping (FR), and programmable crypto.

The MIDS terminal is based on Time Division Multiple Access (TDMA) data-link technology with 128 time slots per second; during each time slot, only one terminal is allowed to transmit while all the other terminals on the same network are set to receive. To improve the anti-jamming capability signals are spread over 51 frequencies in the 960–1215 MHz frequency band; transmission is inhibited around the two IFF bands (1030 and 1090 MHz.)

The maximum output power of a MIDS terminal is 200 Watts which allows an operational range of 300 miles; range can be extended by relaying information between intermediate terminals.

== MIDS Components ==
The MIDS terminal consists of two different Line Replacement Units (LRUs): the Main Terminal and the Remote Power supply (RPS). The Main Terminal consists of 10 Shop Replaceable Units (SRUs):

- Chassis
- Power Amplifier (PA)
- Exciter/IPF (Interference Protection Feature)
- Receiver Synthesizer (R/S, 2 per terminal), Either LVT(1), LVT(2), LVT(3), or JTRS Terminals
- Signal Message Processor (SMP)
- Tactical Air Navigation (TACAN)
- Voice
- Tailored Processor (TP)/Avionic MUX (1553B/3910)
- Data Processor (DP)/Ground MUX (X.25/Ethernet)
- Receiver-Transmitter Interface (RTI/Discrete)

In addition there are a few accessories required by some specific platforms:

- High Power Amplifier Interface Assembly (HIA)
- Direct Current Adapter (DCA)
- Alternating Current Adapter (ACA)

The MIDS terminal is equipped with four different interfaces to communicate with the host platform:

- MIL-STD-1553B
- STANAG 3910
- Ethernet
- X.25

Data rate can vary between 108 and 238 kbit/s, depending on the interface used. Secure voice messages are available with two different rates: 16 kbit/s and 2.4 kbit/s. The MIDS software (SW) consists of two main configuration items:

- Core SW (basically a modified JTIDS SW), which handles the LINK-16 messages;
- Tailored Input/Output (I/O) SW, which handles communications with the host platform.

MIDS Terminals exchange communication data with an onboard computer platform known as the Host which will format, filter, and/or condition communication data for presentation.

== MIDS Receiver Synthesizer line cards variants ==
=== MIDS-JTRS ===
MIDS-JTRS is a software-defined radio that is compliant with the JTRS Software Communication Architecture (SCA). MIDS-JTRS is a replacement for MIDS-LVT and adds three additional channels for JTRS waveforms. As the MIDS-LVT migrates to the JTRS compliance, the system will maintain its link 16 and TACAN functionality with Navy and Air Force platforms that use MIDS-LVT but also accommodates future technologies and capabilities as part of MIDS-JTRS. MIDS-JTRS improvements include enhanced link 16 throughput, link 16 frequency remapping and programmable crypto. MIDS-JTRS will provide an additional three 2-megahertz or 2 gigahertz programmable channels to accommodate incremental delivery of advanced JTRS waveforms.

=== MIDS-LVT ===
The MIDS family includes 3 main variants.

- LVT(1), which was developed for integration on a multitude of surface and airborne platforms, and is characterized by PhEN 3910, MIL-STD-1553B, Ethernet, and X.25 physical interfaces, and the adoption of both Voice and TACAN functions.
- LVT(2) was developed by the US, specifically to satisfy the requirements set by the US Army. This terminal is characterized by unique power supply and blower systems, and by the Army Data Distribution System Interface (ADDSI) X.25 interface.
- FDLT or LVT(3) (Fighter Data Link Terminal) specifically developed to meet the requirements of F-15 fighter platforms.

Additional variants:

- MoS (MIDS On Ship) designed for rack mounting (in place of JTIDS), with specific power supply and high power amplifier units.

Overall 11 different variants of the MIDS-LVT are known.

One commonly used instance of an MIDS is the MIDS Low Volume Terminal (MIDS-LVT) which has been funded by the United States, France, Germany, Italy, and Spain and developed by MIDSCO, a joint venture by Thomson-CSF, GEC, Siemens, Italtel, and Enosa. Another such terminal is the MIDS-JTRS (MIDS Joint Tactical Radio System), which is currently under development by the United States. An older MIDS is the JTIDS (Joint Tactical Information Distribution System). Currently, there are three production lines, which are competitors: ViaSat, Inc (USA), Data Link Solutions LLC (USA), and EuroMIDS (Europe).

Variations of MIDS-LVTs
Families	Terminal Type	Specification			Function			interface			Platforms
Families	Terminal Type	L×W×H [cm]	Weight [kg]	Max Power Output [Watt]	Link-16 IJMS	Voice	TACAN	1553	X.25	Ethernet	Platforms
(3)	MIDS-LVT(3); USQ-140(V)3(C)	Term: 34×19×19; RPS: 34×6×19	Term: 16.8; RPS: 3.5	50	Yes	No	No	Yes	No	No	・McDonnell Douglas F-15 ・Mitsubishi F-15J ・UCAVs
(1)	MIDS-LVT(1); USQ-140(V)1(C) RT-1840	Term: 34×19×19; RPS: 34×6×19	Term: 22.2; RPS: 6.5	200 (1000W with HPAG)	Yes	Yes	Yes	Yes	No	Platform D	・Northrop Grumman E-2D ・McDonnell Douglas F/A-18 ・Eurofighter Typhoon ・Dassault Rafale
(1)	MIDS-LVT(4); USQ-140(V)4(C) RT-1841	Term: 34×19×19; RPS: 34×6×19	Term: 22.2; RPS: 6.5	200 (1000W with HPAG)	Yes	Yes	No	Yes	No	Platform D	・Saab JAS 39 ・Ground
(1)	MIDS-LVT(5); USQ-140(V)5(C) RT-1841	Term: 34×19×19; RPS: 34×6×19	Term: 22.2; RPS: 6.5	200 (1000W with HPAG)	Yes	Yes	No	Yes	No	Platform D	・Maritime ・AWACS
(1)	MIDS-LVT(6); USQ-140(V)1(C) RT-1842	Term: 34×19×19; RPS: 34×6×19	Term: 22.2; RPS: 6.5	200	Yes	No	Yes	Yes	No	Platform D	・Lockheed AC-130 ・General Dynamics F-16
(1)	MIDS-LVT(7); USQ-140(V)1(C) RT-1843	Term: 34×19×19; RPS: 34×6×19	Term: 22.2; RPS: 6.5	200	Yes	No	No	Yes	No	Platform D	・Northrop Grumman B-2
(2)/(11)	MIDS-LVT(2); USQ-140(V)2(C) RT-1785	Term: 34×19×19; Overall: 63×33×21	Term: 17.4; PSA: 11.6; Cooling Unit: 4.6; Mounting Base: 3.1	200	Yes	No	No	No	Yes	Platform J	・Ground forces
(2)/(11)	MIDS-LVT(11); USQ-140(V)11(C) RT-1868	Term: 34×19×19; Overall: 63×33×21	Term: 17.4; PSA: 11.6; Cooling Unit: 4.6; Mounting Base: 3.1	200	Yes	Yes	No	No	Yes	Platform J	・TACP

== See also ==
- Joint Tactical Info Distribution System (JTIDS)
- Joint Tactical Radio System (JTRS)
- Tactical Data Link
- Link 16
- Link 11
- Link 4
