= Tactical data link =

Military data link standard

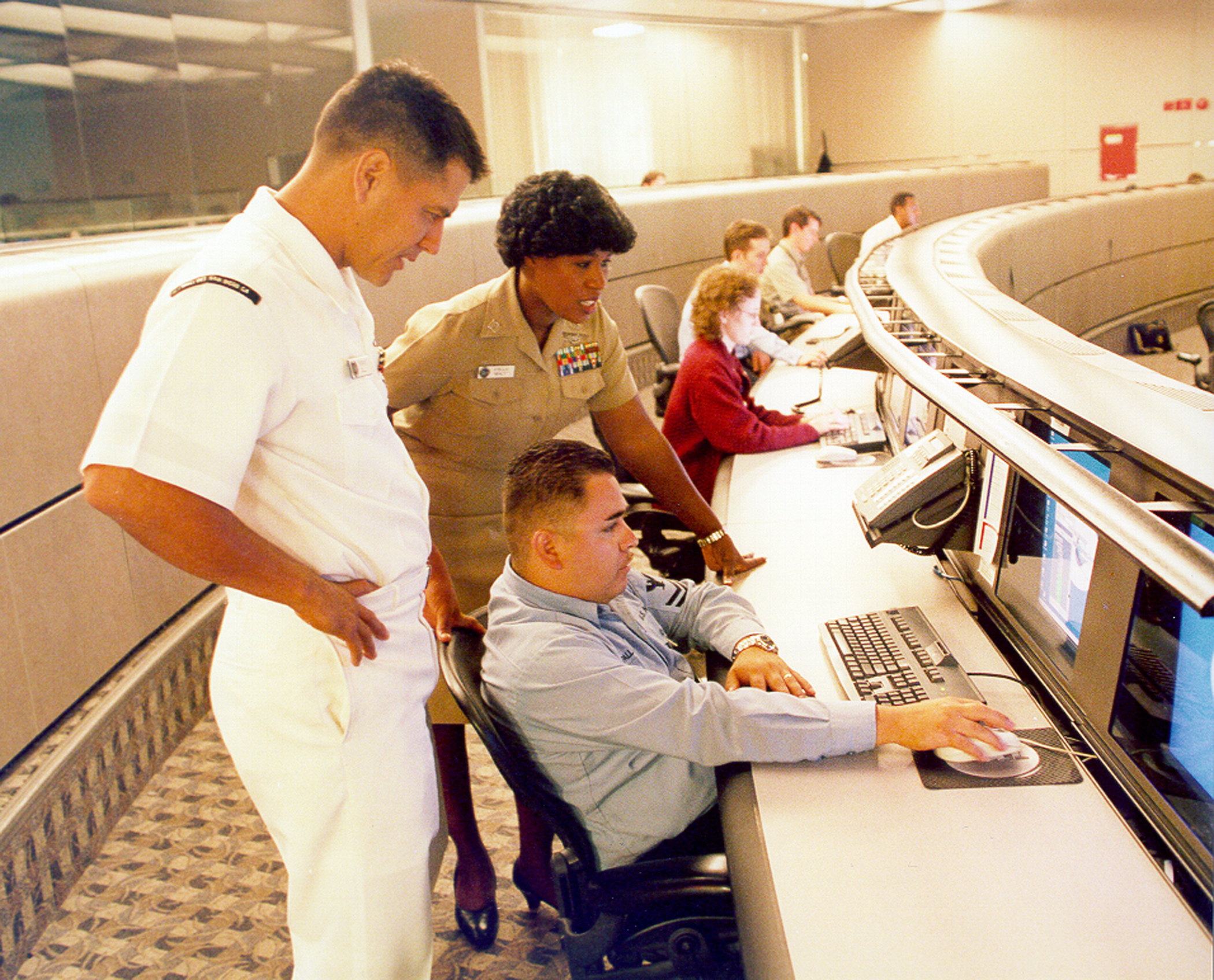
IT technicians study TDL data on a computer terminal (US Naval Network and Space Operations Command) in a June 2004 image

A tactical data link (TDL) uses a data link standard in order to provide communication via radio waves or cable. NATO nations use a variety of TDL standards. All military C3 systems use standardized TDL to transmit, relay and receive tactical data.

Multi-TDL network (MTN) refers to the network of similar and dissimilar TDLs integrated through gateways, translators, and correlators to bring the common tactical picture and/or common operational picture together.

== Change of terminology ==
The term tactical digital information link (TADIL) was made obsolete (per DISA guidance) and is now more commonly seen as tactical data link (TDL).

== Tactical data link character ==
TDLs are characterized by their standard message and transmission formats. This is usually written as <Message Format>/<Transmission Format>.

== TDL standards in NATO ==
In NATO, tactical data link standards are being developed by the Data Link Working Group (DLWG) of the Information Systems Sub-Committee (ISSC) in line with the appropriate STANAG.

In NATO, there exist tactical data link standards as follows:

Synopsis of TDL links
Link No	STANAG	Working Title	Final title / description	Communi- cation	Gene- ration	Comments
1	5501	NATO data link between Air Defence Main Control Centres	Link 1 – Tactical Data Exchange for Air Defence	Point-to-point	1st S–Series	Ground Link between NADGE entities limited and not secure
2		Radar to Control Centre Data Link			1st	Cancelled (includes in Link 1)
3		Control Centre to higher HQ Data Links	SHOC Early Warning System	Point-to-point	1st	Slow Speed Warning Link from evaluation centres to SHAPE
4	5504	Ground to Air Data Link	Link 4 – TDL for the Control of Military aircraft	Point-to-point	1st C/R–Series	Compatible to US TADIL–C to be operated in NATO UHF (225–400 MHz) RF band
5		Fast HF Automatic Link	Broadcast		1st	Cancelled (see Link 11)
6	5506 (Draft)	Missile Base to Control Centre Link	Link 6 – (NADGE Link) SAM Automatic Data Link	Point-to-point	1st	Draft STANAG (US MBDL, ATDL–1, PADIL)
7	5507 (Draft)	ATC / Defence Link	Link 7 – TDL for ATC	Point-to-point	1st	
8		HF Automatic Link		Broadcast	1st	Cancelled (see Link 1)
9		SOC / Airbase Link			1st	
10	5510	Ship – Ship Link	Link 10 – Maritime; Tactical Data Exchange	Broadcast	2nd M–Series	STANAG cancelled (was used by BE, NL and UK)
11	5511	Fast HF Automatic Link	Link 11 – Maritime Tactical Data Exchange	Broadcast	2nd M–Series	Compatible to US TADIL–A to be operated in the HF & NATO UHF RF bands
11B	5511 (Vol. II)		Link 11B – Tactical Data Exchange	Point-to-point	2nd M–Series	Compatible to the US TADIL–B Ground to Ground TDL
12		Fast HF Automatic Link				Cancelled (see Link 11)
13		HF Automatic Link		Broadcast		Cancelled (see Link 11)
14	5514	Slow Semi–Automatic Link	Link 14 – Maritime TDL	Broadcast	1st D/M/S/E–Series	Ship–Ship & Ship–Shore (only few applications)
15		Slow Semi–Automatic Link				Ship–Ship, Cancelled
16	5516	High Capacity, ECM Resistant, Multifunctional, TDMA Link	Link 16 – ECM Resistant Tactical Data Exchange	Broadcast	3rd J–Series	Compatible to US TADIL–J (STANAG 4175 – Technical Characteristics of MIDS)
21	5521 (Draft)	Link in support of ACCS – (LISA)		Point-to-point	3rd J–Series	Under development (planned to replace Link 1 and Link 11B)
22	5522 (Draft)	NATO Improved Link 11 – (NILE)	Link 22		3rd J–Series	Under development (planned to replace Link 11)
	5601	Standard for Interface of Data Links 1, 11, 11B, and 14 through a buffer				see AdalP 12
	5602	Standard Interface for Multiple Platform Link Evaluation (SIMPLE)				Enables transmission of J-Series (TADIL-J) messages over IP-based protocols
MIL-STD-6020	5616	Standard for data forwarding between tactical data systems employing Links 11/11B and tactical data systems employing Link 16	MIL-STD-6020, DoD Interoperability Standard: Data Forwarding between TDLs			
IJMS		ECM Resistant Communication System (ERCS)	IJMS – Interim JTIDS/MIDS Message Specification	Broadcast	2nd, M–Series	Interim Data Link Standard to be replaced by Link 16
SADL		Situational Awareness Data Link	SADL – Situational Awareness Data Link	Broadcast	1st, K-Series; 2nd, K/J–Series	Data link adopted from EPLRS to provide A-10s and F-16s data link capability air-to-ground and air-to-air

Beyond NATO countries, NATO partner countries have also developed some degree of interoperability with these standards since the 2014 Partnership Interoperability Initiative.

== See also ==
- BACN
- Global Information Grid
- Inter/Intra Flight Data Link (IFDL)
- JREAP
- MANDRIL
- Multifunction Advanced Data Link
- Network emulation for simulation / emulation of tactical data links
- SIMPLE
- Tactical Common Data Link
- Link-17 – Tactical data link used by the Pakistan Air Force
