= MIL-STD-6011 =

NATO radio link

NATO link 11 Broadcasting on 2022-03-25 at 4469.3 kHz

TADIL-A/Link 11 is a secure half-duplex tactical data link used by NATO to exchange digital data. It was originally developed by a joint committee including members from the Royal Canadian Navy, US Navy and Royal Navy to pass accurate targeting information between ships. The final standard was signed in Ottawa in November 1957, where the British proposed the name "TIDE" for "Tactical International Data Exchange". It was later made part of the NATO STANAG standardization process.

The system operates in two frequency ranges, one in the high frequency (HF) range for over-the-horizon (OTH) communications, and another in the ultra high frequency (UHF) range that uses much smaller antennas and is suitable for smaller ships but lacks the OTH performance. The system broadcasts packets of 30 bits length, with 6 bits of error correction and 24 bits of payload data. The payload is encrypted.

Link 14 was adopted at the same time as a low-end counterpart to Link 11. Link 14 is essentially a digital teleprinter system lacking encryption and automation, intended for ships lacking the ability to use Link 11 data in an automated fashion.

The designation "Link 11" is derived from "Link II", the British designation using Roman numerals before NATO standardized on Arabic numerals. "Link I" was the data link used by the Comprehensive Display System.

== Overview ==
MIL-STD-6011 exchanges digital information among airborne, land-based, and shipboard tactical data systems. It is the primary means to exchange data such as radar tracking information beyond line of sight. TADIL-A can be used on either high frequency (HF) or ultrahigh frequency (UHF). However, the U.S. Army uses only HF. Link 11 relies on a single platform to report positional information on sensor detections. This positional information can be amplified with additional data to qualify the identity of the detected track. Link 11 was developed by Ralph Benjamin while with the Admiralty Surface Weapons Establishment (ASWE), Portsmouth.

Link 11 will be replaced by Link 22.

Link 11 is defined by the United States Department of Defense as MIL-STD-6011.

The NAUTIS (Naval Autonomous Tactical Information System) originally included the Link 11 system as installed in the Royal New Zealand Navy's Leander-class frigates as part of the mid-life upgrades in the 1980s HMNZS Canterbury; NAUTIS versions were also found on the Royal Navy Hunt-class minesweepers.

== Technical characteristics ==
Link 11 is a half-duplex, netted link that normally operates by roll call from a data net control station (DNCS). Link 11 can also operate in the broadcast mode. The roll call mode of operation used in the Link 11 interface requires that each participating unit (PU) respond in turn while all other stations are receiving. A DNCS initiates the roll call by addressing and transmitting an interrogation message to a specific PU that then responds by transmitting its data. The DNCS then interrogates the next PU in the prescribed roll call. Link 11 can be transmitted on high frequency (HF) and/or Ultra High Frequency (UHF) bands. Data speed can be selected from bit rates of 2250 or 1364 bits per second. Dual sideband diversity operation and Doppler shift correction features improve reliability and accuracy of data exchange. Link 11 operates on HF (2-30 MHz) and/or UHF (line of sight (LOS)) (225-400 MHz). Some data terminal sets (DTS) provide the option to select either the conventional Link 11 waveform (CLEW) or the single tone Link 11 Waveform (SLEW). SLEW and CLEW are not compatible waveforms. SLEW, among other enhancements, provides increased propagation and a more powerful error detection and correction (EDAC) algorithm. While the option exists to operate in either CLEW or SLEW, all participants in a given Link 11 net must select the same waveform to achieve connectivity between units. Link 11 is defined in military standard (MIL STD) 6011, Tactical Data Link (TDL) A/B Message Standard.

== Change of terminology ==
The term Tactical Digital Information Link (TADIL) was obsolete (per DISA guidance) and is now more commonly seen as Tactical Data Link (TDL)

== See also ==
- Comprehensive Display System
- DATAR
