= Joint Tactical Information Distribution System =

Radio system used by the U.S. armed forces

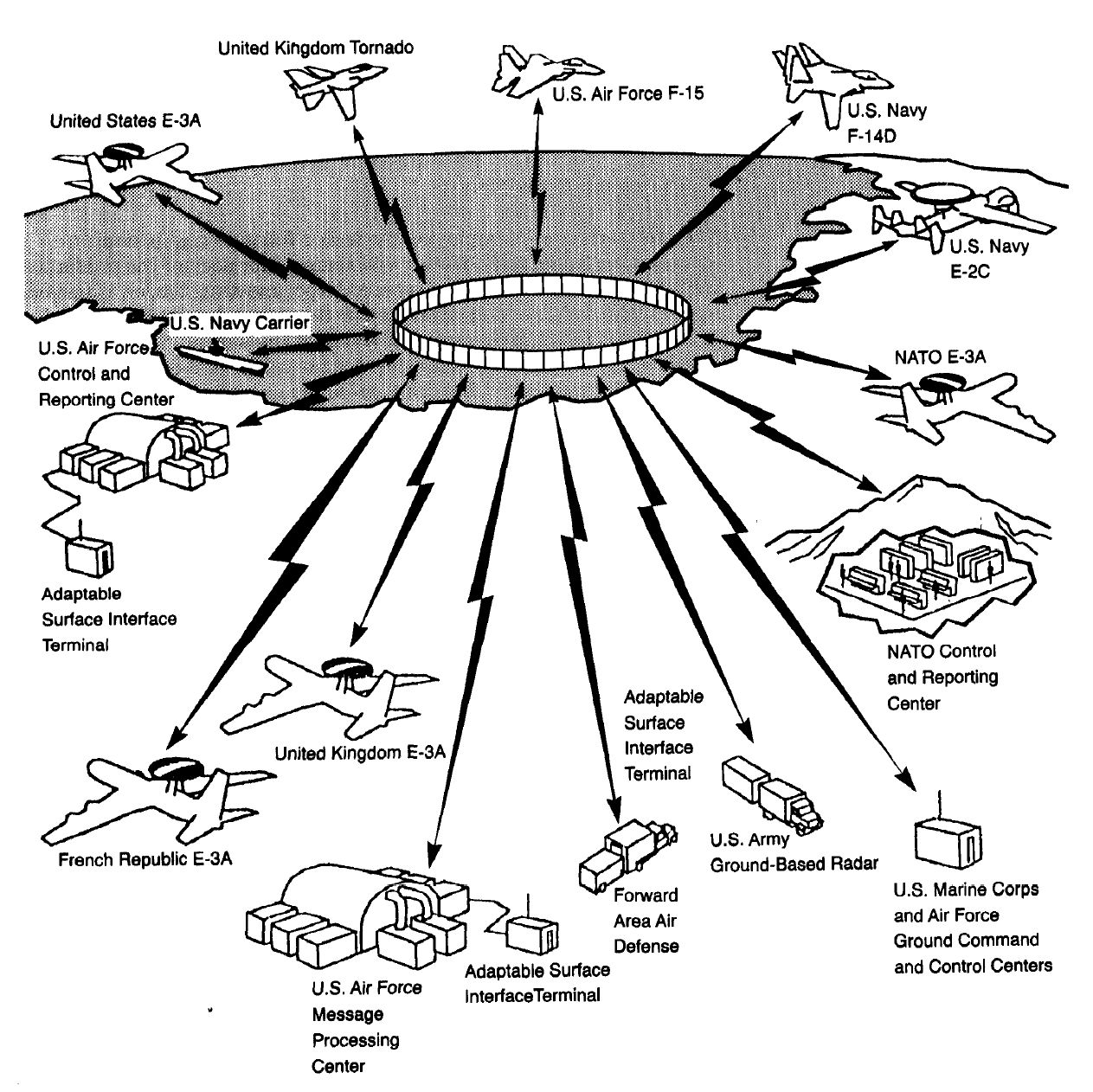
Joint Tactical Information Distribution System Users, 1990

The Joint Tactical Information Distribution System (JTIDS) is an L band Distributed Time Division Multiple Access (DTDMA) network radio system used by the United States Department of Defense and their allies to provide secure Integrated Communications, Navigation, and Identification (ICNI) by data communications needs, principally in the air and missile defense community.

JTIDS radiates 6.4 μs long pulses (measured at the 90% amplitude points) followed by a 6.6 μs long pause. Each pulse conveys five bits of data, each represented by a 32-chip cyclic code shift keying pattern obtained from a cyclic permutations of a fixed 32-bit pattern. The 32-chip sequence are encrypted in secure modes of operation, and is then modulated with Continuous Phase Shift Modulation (CPSM) at 5 megabit-per-second (Mbps), also referred to as Minimum Frequency Shift Keying (MFSK).

The Pulses are transmitted in the by ITU (International Telecommunication Union) to the Aeronautical Radio Navigation System (ARNS) assigned band between 960 MHz to 1215 MHz. The band is today divided in two bands which are additionally assigned to the Aeronautical Mobile (R) Service (AM(R)S) between 960 MHz to 1164 MHz band and the Radio Navigation Satellite Service (RNSS) between 1164 MHz to 1215 MHz. The pulses are transmitted frequency hopping on 51 center-frequencies between 969 MHz and 1206 MHz. These are divided into three subbands (969 MHz to 1008 MHz, 1053 MHz to 1065 MHz and 1113 MHz to 1206 MHz).

Since JTIDS/MIDS is not a worldwide accepted system for the use in the frequency band between 960 MHz to 1215 MHz, JTIDS/MIDS can only be operated on Non Interference Base (NIB) to the Primary and Secondary Services to which the band is allocated by ITU. Operation is subject to the limits and restrictions for operations defined in each national Frequency Clearance Agreements (FCA) by a country and differ e.g. in the permissible Equivalent Isotropically Radiated Power (EIRP) or Time Slot Duty Factor (TSDF) that has to be met by all JTIDS/MIDS transmitters within a given volume within Radio Line Of Sight (RLOS). The current version for Link 16 Spectrum Operations and Deconfliction is provided in, while a Comparison of National Link 16 (JTIDS/MIDS) Frequency Clearance Agreement, Geographic Area Limits and EMC Test Program Equipment Environments for Europe can be found in.

A JTIDS/MIDS network employs Time Division Multiple Access (TDMA) (similar to cell phone technology) combined with frequency hopping by selecting more or less randomly a frequency for transmission of each pulse among the maximum defined 51 center-frequencies. To reduce the Radio Frequency Interference (RFI) impact of JTIDS/MIDS pulses onto the primary systems, consecutive pulses shall not be a closely adjacent center-frequency to the previously used center-frequency.

Time slots are assigned to a single user (e.g. AWACS) or a group of users (e.g. fighter jets) subscribed to the same JTIDS/MIDS network. This is accomplished by definition of a period called an epoch with a duration of 12.8 minutes consisting of 98304 time slots, before repeating the sequence. Each epoch is divided into 64 individual, 12 second (s) long time frames. Each time frame is divided into 1536 time slots, having a duration of 7.8125 milliseconds (ms) in duration, providing 128 time slots per second for the transmission or reception of data. A time slot is defined by a duration of 7,8125 ms. A time slot can consist of 72 pulses, 258 pulses or 444 pulses, which depends on the message format employed. Each pulse in a time slot is defined by an on time of 6.4 μs (measured at the 90% amplitude points) and followed by a 6.6 μs long pause. Each pulse is transmitted at a more or less randomly selected different carrier frequencies sequentially. Within each slot, the phase angle of the transmission burst is varied to provide PSK.

To reduce the Radio Frequency Interference (RFI) impact of a JTIDS/MIDS networks onto the systems of the primary user the number of permissible Time Slots are defined as the Time Slot Duty Factor (TSDF), which is a two term parameter to specify the transmitted number of pulses allowed for a community of JTIDS terminals during each 12-second frame. The first term is the percentage indicator of the permissible number of transmissions for the total JTIDS/MIDS community, while the second percentage term indicates the max. number that can be transmitted by a single terminal, e.g. a TSDF of 100/50 specifies that the total community is limited to a pulse density of 396,288 transmitted pulses in a 12 second frame, while the maximum limit of pulses for a single JTIDS/MIDS user is limited to 198,144 transmitted pulses. The TSDF is always stated in terms of 258 pulses per time slot.

Therefore, the total number of pulses can be derived for a 100/50 TSDF by considering the 100 percent for the total community by the formula:

$100 %\ TSDF \ = \frac{258\ pulses}{time\ slot} * \frac{1536\ time\ slots}{12\ second\ frame}\ =\ 396,288 \frac{pulses}{12\ second\ frame}$

For message formats that employ a different number of pulses in a time slot, e.g. a Pack 4 single-pulse message with 444 pulses, the time slot limitation for a TSDF of 100/50 can be derived by the following formula:

$Pack\ 4 \quad time\ slot\ limitation \ = \ \frac{396,288\ pulses}{\frac{444\ pulses}{time\ slot}*\frac{1536\ time\ slots}{12\ second\ frame}}\ = \ 58\ %$

More than one network can be defined and operated in parallel, each network having their own frequency hopping pattern for their subscribed users.

JTIDS/MIDS was initially developed for the US forces, but was later made available to the NATO states and some states in Europe, Asia, the pacific area and South America, where JTIDS/MIDS is still in use today. Since ITU allocated the frequency range between 960 MHz to 1215 MHz for ICAO systems (International Civil Aviation Organization) of the Aeronautical Radio Navigation Service (ARNS), and since no international allocation for the use of JTIDS/MIDS was made, operation of JTIDS/MIDS is limited to Non Interference base use to the Primary Services to which the frequency band between 960 MHz to 1215 MHz has been allocated on a worldwide basis. Operation within a state is subject to limitations and restrictions, which have to be defined in a JTIDS/MIDS Frequency Clearance Agreement (FCA) by each state before JTIDS/MIDS can be operated in that state. While FCA are similar in most states, the can significantly differ depending on local systems in use and density of equipment, and differ e.g. in maximum TSDF or EIRP.

To minimize the impact of JTIDS/MIDS signals during operation on the systems and equipment of the primary systems in the frequency range 960 MHz to 1215 MHz to an acceptable level the ElectroMagnetic Compatibility (EMC) had to be proven in extensive bench and flight tests to the Federal Aviation Administration (FAA) and the ministries supervising aviation safety in the partner states that took part in the JTIDS/MIDS program.

The following Aeronautical Radio Navigation Service (ARNS) systems are in operation in this band:

- Distance Measuring Equipment (DME/ and DME/P) and ICAO compliant use of
- TACtical Air Navigation (TACAN)
- Secondary Surveillance Radar (SSR) - Mode A and Mode C that has in the US the designation ATCRBS (Air Traffic Control Radar Beacon System) - Mode S (Mode Selective)

Systems that are based on the functionality of SSR Mode A, Mode C and Mode S, which are

- Airborne Collision Avoidance System (ACAS) that has in the US the designation TCAS (Traffic Collision Avoidance System) since the industry had proposed before TCAS a system that was ACAS, so TCAS was chosen
- Automatic Dependent Surveillance – Broadcast (ADS-B)
- MultiLATeration Systems (MLAT systems)

Later, the frequency range was split by ITU to allocate the frequency range to additional systems on a primary basis. The lower band segment has a frequency range of 960 MHz to 1164 MHz and received an additional allocation by ITU for the Aeronautical Mobile (R) Service or AM(R)S. ICAO is currently standardizing:

- L-Band Digital Aeronautical Communications System (LDACS)

The upper band with the frequency range between 1164 MHz bis 1215 MHz received an additional allocation for the Radio Navigation Satellite Service (RNSS), space-to-Earth & space-to-space for the deployment of Global Navigation Satellite Systems (GNSS), which is used currently used for the following GNSS systems:

- GPS L5 (Global Positioning System) with a center frequency for the L5-signal of 1176.45 MHz
- Gallileo E5A und E5B with a center frequency for the E5A-signal of 1176.45 MHz and 1207.14 MHz for the E5B signal
- GLONASS L3OC (Globalnaja nawigazionnaja sputnikowaja sistema) with a center frequency for the L3OC-signal of 1202.025 MHz
- BeiDou B2a/B2b with a centerf requency for the B2a/B2b-signals of 1191.79 MHz

ICAO Standards for the use of the signals of these GNSS systems operating in the frequency range between 1164 MHz bis 1215 MHz are defined in ICAO Annex 10, Volume I.

As a consequence of the additional assignments to the AM(R)S and RNSS systems, additional tests. For the frequency range between 1164 MHz bis 1215 MHz this lead in the US to a Memorandum of Agreement (MOA) between the Department of Defense and the Department of Transportation for Civil Use of the Global Positioning System.

The specifications to achieve Electromagnetic Compatibility between JTIDS/MIDS and the ICAO systems operating in the frequency range between 1164 MHz bis 1215 MHz are defined in the US in DoD 4650.1-R, Link 16 Electromagnetic Compatibility (EMC) Features Certification Process and Requirements, 2005-04-26

The spreading of the pulses of the radiated power over the frequency range between 960 MHz to 1215 MHz has the benefit that it reduces the interference impact on a few channels of the primary systems, while reducing susceptibility to jamming and interference for JTIDS. Each type of data to be transmitted is assigned a slot or block of slots (channel) to manage information exchanges among user participation groups. In traditional TDMA, the slot frequencies remain fixed from second to second (frame to frame). In JTIDS TDMA, the slot frequencies and/or slot assignments for each channel do not remain fixed from frame to frame but are varied in a pseudo-random manner. The slot assignments, frequencies, and information for each JTIDS/MIDS network are all encrypted to provide computer-to-computer connectivity in support of every type of military platform to include U.S. Air Force fighter aircraft and United States Navy submarines.

The full development of JTIDS commenced in 1981 when a contract was placed with Singer-Kearfott (later GEC-Marconi Electronic Systems, now BAE Systems E&IS). Fielding proceeded slowly throughout the late 1980s and early 1990s with rapid expansion (following the September 11 attacks in 2001) in preparation for Operation Enduring Freedom (Afghanistan) and Operation Iraqi Freedom. Development is now carried out by Data Link Solutions, a joint BAE/Rockwell Collins company, ViaSat, and the MIDS International consortium.

== See also ==
- List of established military terms
- Glossary of military abbreviations
- Air Defense Control Center
- Combat Information Center
- Tactical communications
- Naval Tactical Data System
- Mission Control Center
- Electronics Technician
