= Marsh (surname) =

Marsh is an English surname. In most cases it is a topographic or locative name from the Old English word mersc ("marsh, fen, wetland"), denoting someone who lived by a marsh or fen, or who came from one of the many minor places called Marsh. In a smaller number of cases the surname is of Anglo-Norman origin, from del Mareis or the Latinized de Marisco ("of the marsh").

== Etymology and origin ==
The principal source of the surname is the Old English common noun mersc (later Middle English mersh, marsh), meaning marsh, fen or low-lying wetland. As a topographic surname it was applied to a person who lived beside such ground; as a locative name it identified someone who had come from one of the numerous settlements named Marsh — found in Yorkshire, Shropshire, Buckinghamshire and elsewhere — several of which take their own names from the same word. Middle English forms of the surname commonly appear with the locative prepositions del or atte ("of the", "at the"), as in del Mersh and atte Mersh.

A separate, minority strand is of Anglo-Norman derivation, from Old French mareis, marais ("marsh"), appearing in medieval records in the Latinized form de Marisco ("of the marsh"). Bearers recorded under this form may descend from Norman families, though the native English origin accounts for the majority of the name.

The surname Marsh should not be confused with the distinct surname March, which derives from a different root — Old English mearc or Old French marche ("boundary, border"), as in the Welsh Marches. The two surnames were treated as equivalent in some older reference works, but modern onomastic scholarship keeps them separate.

== People ==
- Abigail Marsh, American psychologist and researcher
- Adam Marsh (c. 1200–1259), English Franciscan, scholar and theologian
- Adrian Marsh (born 1978), English cricketer
- Albert L. Marsh (1877–1944), American metallurgist
- Albert Marsh (Medal of Honor recipient) (died 1895), U.S. Medal of Honor recipient
- Alec Marsh (born 1998), American baseball player
- Alice Marsh (1911–1976), American socialite, mistress of U.S. President Lyndon B. Johnson
- Andrew Marsh (American football) (born 2007), American football player
- Anna Marsh (died 1834), established the Vermont Asylum of the Insane
- Anne Marsh-Caldwell (1791–1874), English novelist
- Arno Marsh (1928–2019), American jazz musician
- Arthur Hardwick Marsh (1842–1909), English painter and watercolorist
- B. J. Marsh (1940–2020), American politician
- Billy Marsh (1917–1995), British theatrical agent
- Brad Marsh (born 1958), Canadian professional ice hockey player
- Brandon Marsh (baseball) (born 1997), American professional baseball player
- Carol Marsh (1926–2010), British film actress
- Charles Marsh (disambiguation), several people
- Clifton E. Marsh (born 1946), American author, sociologist and educator
- Daniel L. Marsh (1880–1968), American Boston University president
- Daniel William Marsh (born 1997), American murderer
- Danielle Marsh (born 2005), Korean-Australian member of South Korean girl group NewJeans
- Dan Marsh, Canadian professional wrestling referee and wrestler
- Dave Marsh (1950–2026), American music critic
- David Marsh (disambiguation), several people
- D. E. Marsh (1862–1933), English Locomotive Superintendent
- Edward Marsh (disambiguation), several people
- Francis Marsh (1626–1693), Archbishop of Dublin
- Frank Lewis Marsh (1899–1992), American biologist
- Fred Marsh (1924–2006), American baseball player
- Gary Marsh, Disney Channel executive
- Geoff Marsh (born 1958), Australian cricketer and coach
- George Marsh (disambiguation), several people
- George Perkins Marsh (1801–1882), American philologist and diplomat
- Graham Marsh (born 1944), Australian professional golfer
- Helene Marsh (born 1945), Australian marine biologist
- Henry Marsh (athlete) (born 1954), American steeplechase athlete
- Henry L. Marsh (1933–2025), American civil rights lawyer and politician in Virginia
- Herbert Marsh (1757–1839), Church of England Bishop
- Howard Marsh (died 1969), Broadway tenor
- Hugh Marsh (born 1955), Canadian violinist
- Ian Craig Marsh (born 1956), English musician and composer
- Jack Marsh (disambiguation), several people
- Jacki Marsh, American politician
- Jackie Marsh (footballer) (born 1948), English former footballer
- James Marsh (disambiguation), several people
- Jean Marsh (1934–2025), English actress
- Jeff "Swampy" Marsh (born 1960), American cartoon creator & animator.
- Jem Marsh (1930–2015), British engineer and racing car driver
- Jeremiah Marsh, Dean of Kilmore
- Jesse Marsh (1907–1966), American comic book and animation artist
- JJ Marsh (born 1966), Swedish guitarist and composer
- Joan Marsh (1913–2000), American actress
- Jodie Marsh (born 1978), British glamour model and reality TV star
- John Marsh (disambiguation), several people
- Keith Marsh (1926–2013), English actor
- Kyal Marsh (born 1987), Australian actor
- Kym Marsh (born 1976), English actress and singer
- Lina Marsh (born 1972/73), New Zealand multidisciplinary artist, musician and teacher
- Linda Marsh (born 1939), American actress
- Lou Marsh (1879–1936), Canadian athlete and sports journalist
- Madison Marsh (born 2001), American air force officer and Miss America 2024 titleholder
- Mae Marsh (1894–1968), American actress
- Marian Marsh (1913–2006), Trinidad-born American actress
- Matthew Marsh (disambiguation), several people
- Melissa Marsh (born 1985), Australian basketball player
- Michael Marsh (athlete) (born 1967), American sprinter
- Michael Marsh (journalist), American television news anchor
- Michele Marsh (disambiguation), several people
- Michelle Marsh (model) (born 1982), British glamour model
- Mike Marsh (disambiguation), several people
- Mitchell Marsh (born 1991), Australian cricketer
- Narcissus Marsh (1638–1713), English clergyman
- Ngaio Marsh (1895–1982), New Zealand mystery novelist and theatre director
- Nick Marsh (American football) (born 2006), American football player
- Olivia Marsh (born 2000), South Korean-Australian singer-song writer
- Oliver T. Marsh (1892–1941), American cinematographer
- Othniel Charles Marsh (1831–1899), American paleontologist
- Ozan Marsh (1920–1992), American concert pianist
- Pat Marsh (born 1949), American politician
- Pat Marsh (ice hockey) (1934–2017), British ice hockey administrator
- Paul Marsh (South African cricketer) (born 1939), South African cricketer
- Peter Marsh (Musician) (born 1952), English musician
- PJ Marsh (born 1980), Australian rugby league player
- Phil Marsh (born 1986), English footballer
- Rachel Lindsay Marsh, Pilgrim on the Camino de Santiago
- Ralph Warren Marsh (1899–1992), British mycologist and plant pathologist
- Randy Marsh (umpire) (born 1949), Major League baseball umpire
- Ray Brent Marsh, mortician responsible for the Tri-State Crematory scandal
- Reginald Marsh (disambiguation), several people
  - Reginald Marsh (artist) (1898–1954), American painter
  - Reginald Marsh (actor) (1926–2001), English comic actor
  - Reginald Marsh (cricketer) (1897–1969), English cricketer
- Ricardo Marsh (born 1981), American basketball player in Israel
- Richard Marsh (disambiguation), several people
- Roya Marsh, American poet
- Robert Marsh (disambiguation), several people
  - Robert T. Marsh (1925 - 2017), United States Air Force general
  - Robert H. Marsh (born 1952), American politician and political aide
  - Robert James Marsh, mathematician and Whitehead Prize winner
  - Robert McC. Marsh (1878–1958), American lawyer, politician, and judge
  - Robert Marsh (cyclist) (born 1968), cyclist from Antigua and Barbuda
- Robert Marsh (banker), Governor of the Bank of England, 1762–1764
  - Robert Burkall Marsh (born 1950), Welsh-born painter in New Zealand
- Rod Marsh (1947–2022), Australian cricketer
- Rodney Marsh (footballer) (born 1944), English footballer
- Roger Marsh (born 1949), British composer
- Sally Ann Marsh, British singer and actress
- Samuel Marsh (footballer) (1879–?), English footballer
- Samuel Marsh (railroad executive) (1786–1872), American president of Erie Railroad
- Samuel Marsh (politician) (c. 1736–1795), London merchant and politician
- Selina Tusitala Marsh (born 1971), Pasifika poet–scholar
- Shaun Marsh (born 1983), Australian cricketer
- Sir Henry Marsh, 1st Baronet (1790-1860), Anglo-Irish physician and surgeon
- Stanley Marsh 3 (1938–2014), American artist and philanthropist
- Susan Louise Marsh (1867–1946), American activist and children's advocate
- Terry Marsh (disambiguation), several people
- Thomas B. Marsh (1799–1866), leader in the Latter Day Saint movement
- Tom Marsh (disambiguation), several people
- Tony Marsh (disambiguation), several people
- Tyler Marsh (born 1987), American basketball player and coach
- Vivian Osborne Marsh (1898–1986), American clubwoman
- Walter Marsh, Australian journalist, former editor of Rip It Up magazine
- Warne Marsh (1927–1987), American tenor saxophonist
- William Henry Marsh, governor of Hong Kong 1882–83 and 1885–87
- Paul Alexander Marsh (Sailing Champion), 2025 505 Yacht Racing World Champion Crew

== Fictional ==
- Stan Marsh, one of the main characters of South Park
  - Randy Marsh, Stan's father
  - Sharon Marsh, Stan's mother
  - Shelley Marsh, Stan's older sister
- Beverly Marsh, a protagonist of Stephen King's It
- Kate Marsh, a character in video game Life Is Strange
