= John Marsh =

John Marsh may refer to:

== Politicians ==
- John Marsh (14th-century MP) (fl. 1394–1397), MP for Bath
- John Marsh (15th-century MP) (fl. 1414–1421), MP for Bath
- John Allmond Marsh (1894–1952), Canadian member of parliament
- John O. Marsh Jr. (1926–2019), American congressman and Secretary of the Army

== Association football ==
- John Marsh (footballer, born 1842) (1842–1880), English cricket player and footballer
- Jack Marsh (footballer, born 1922) (John Kirk Marsh, 1922–1997), English footballer
- John Marsh (footballer, born 1940), English footballer
- Jack Marsh (footballer, born 1947) (John William Marsh), English footballer
- Jackie Marsh (footballer) (John Henry Marsh, born 1948), English footballer

== Others ==
- John Marsh (died 1688/1689), of Hartford, son-in-law of John Webster
- John Marsh (1611–1674), of Salem, son-in-law of Samuel Skelton
- John Marsh (composer) (1752–1828), English composer, diarist and writer
- John Marsh (minister) (1788–1868), American minister and temperance advocate
- John Marsh (pioneer) (1799–1856), American pioneer and early California settler
- John Fitchett Marsh (1818–1880), English solicitor, official and antiquary
- John Marsh (theologian) (1904–1994)
- John Marsh (priest) (born 1947), British Anglican clergyman
- Jon Marsh, musician in The Beloved
- Jack Marsh (1874–1916), Australian cricketer
- John Marsh, CFO of ESS Technology
