= Robert Marsh =

Robert Marsh may refer to:

- Robert T. Marsh (1925–2017), United States Air Force general
- Robert H. Marsh (born 1952), American politician and political aide
- Robert McC. Marsh (1878–1958), American lawyer, politician, and judge
- Robert Marsh (cyclist) (born 1968), cyclist from Antigua and Barbuda
- Robert Marsh (banker), governor of the Bank of England, 1762–1764
- Robert Burkall Marsh (born 1950), Welsh-born painter in New Zealand
