= Shadrinsk Telephone Plant =

Shadrinsk Telephone Plant (Russian: Шадринский телефонный завод) is a company based in Shadrinsk, Russia.

The Shadrinsk Telephone Plant makes telephone apparatus, personal computers, and other communications and computer-related equipment for civil use. It also makes long-distance communications equipment including radio-relay systems for the military.

Established in 1941, the plant made field telephones for the Soviet military, producing 247,000 of them during World War II. In 1975 the plant provided the communication systems for the Apollo–Soyuz Test Project. The company was declared bankrupt in May 2017.
