= Kenneth Bergquist =

Kenneth Bergquist may refer to:

- Kenneth P. Bergquist (United States Air Force) (1912–1993), officer of the United States Air Force
- Kenneth P. Bergquist (Department of Defense) (1944–2023), United States Assistant Secretary of the Navy
