= George Marsh =

George Marsh may refer to:

- George Marsh (martyr) (1515–1555), English Protestant martyr
- George Marsh (Medal of Honor) (died 1915), American soldier who fought in the American Civil War
- George Marsh (Australian footballer) (1882–1965), Australian footballer for Collingwood
- George Marsh (footballer, born 1998), English association footballer
- George Marsh (sport shooter) (born 1938), Canadian Olympic shooter
- George Marsh (musician) (died 1962), American jazz drummer
- George Marsh (architect) (1921–1988), English architect
- George Perkins Marsh (1801–1882), American diplomat and philologist
- George T. Marsh, Canadian politician, mayor of Regina, Saskatchewan in 1895
- George A. Marsh, a three-masted schooner built in Michigan in 1882
