= JEFX =

JEFX, or Joint Expeditionary Force Experiment, was the periodic US Air Force-led operational experiment created to evaluate new technologies and war fighting concepts in a simulated wartime battle environment. It was an outgrowth of the C4I (Command, Control, Communication, Computers and Intelligence) Initiative mandated by the Goldwater-Nichols Act of 1986. It was monitored by the Air Force senior leadership and each event culminated with a report for the Chief of Staff of the Air Force.

== Origins ==
Following Operation Desert Storm, the US Air Force was concerned about the interoperability of deployed command and control equipment. In 1996, AF Electronic Systems Center commander LtGen Franklin created a simulated battle containment area near the runway at Hanscom AFB, Massachusetts. Dubbed the "Fort Franklin Battlespace Laboratory", the experiment highlighted connectivity problems. The following year, Fort Franklin II showed progress but not sufficient to satisfy Air Force leadership.

In 1998 the Air Force's [single service] Expeditionary Force eXperiment (EFX 98) was created to continue the legacy of Fort Franklin. This experimentation and testing venue allowed innovators and formal acquisition programs to try out new equipment, tactics, procedures in a large-scale field environment. The equipment tested included C3 systems, vehicles, aircraft, software, radios, etc. focused on enhancing information/ISR collection and exchange, and improving interoperability. The venue quickly grew to include multiple services and nations and was redesignated The Joint Expeditionary Force eXperiment by 1999 (JEFX 99). It was subsequently conducted biannually in 2000, 2002, 2004, 2006 and 2008 with particular emphasis on C2 and improving the "Kill Chain".

== Projects ==
=== EFX 98 ===
The first experiment, called the Expeditionary Force Experiment, was held in 1998 to look at potentially useful technologies that might be useful 10–15 years down the road. However, at the end of the event, several technologies were seen as near-ready and transition strategies were created. One outcome was establishing the need for an Air Operations Center. It also saw the first use of the Collaborative Virtual Workstation (CVW) to manage a large experiment over the internet.

=== JEFX 99 ===
After the first event, the need was identified to involve other military services in the experiment, and the "Joint" designation was added to the name. Accomplishments include:

- First machine-to-machine data transfer from mission planning to execution monitoring
- First use of Predator video feed to the command post
- First use of online multiuser persistent collaboration - 400 simultaneous users. Resulted in fielding InfoWorkSpace into the Air Operations Center.

=== JEFX 2006 ===
Theme: air-to-air data communication. Outcome: Demonstration and fielding of the Battlefield Airborne Communications Node, a flying gateway between multiple military communications networks, which enabled increased coordination between forces.

=== JEFX 2010 ===
Fiscal 2010 focused on irregular warfare activities, and the use of sensors on combat aircraft, such as the F16 advanced targeting pod, to provide "non-traditional ISR".

=== JEFX 2011 ===
Two themes: degraded space capabilities and unit level operations.

Unified Capabilities I (UC I), which evaluated the ability to leverage commercial cellular networks to provide access to personnel conducting operations around the base.

=== JEFX 2012 ===
Unified Capabilities II, to address a unit level warfighter challenge: effective C2 integration within and across a military base, and dialogue with local and regional authorities during emergency management operations.

== Status ==
Beginning in 2011, JEFX events became smaller, in light of budget shortfalls. The solution was to focus on specific areas for improvement in C2 integration and conducted on a smaller scale on a quarterly basis with occasional large-scale events.

The JEFX office was disestablished in 2013 with the closure of the AFC2IC.

== Transition support ==
In 2002, to address concerns that no demonstrated technology was reaching operational use, a Technology Transition office was established with the JEFX management office. This office created guidebooks, wrote funding requests and monitored development and delivery of JEFX technologies.
