= Reginald Marsh =

Reginald Marsh may refer to:

- Reginald Marsh (artist) (1898–1954), American painter
- Reginald Marsh (actor) (1926–2001), English comic actor
- Reginald Marsh (cricketer) (1897–1969), English cricketer

== See also ==
- Marsh (surname)
