= Freda Brierley =

New Zealand textile artist

- Born: Freda Victoria Selway; 1942 (age 82–83); Dundee, Scotland
- Known for: Textile art
- Spouse: Ken Brierley (m. 1967; died 2023)

Freda Victoria Brierley (née Selway; born 1942) is a New Zealand textile artist.

== Early life and family ==
Brierley was born in Dundee, Scotland, in 1942. The only child of Jane and Fred Selway, she was taught embroidery by her mother. As a child, Brierley wanted to go to art school, but instead trained as a nurse and joined the Royal Navy as a sister in Queen Alexandra's Nursing Service.

In 1967, she married Ken Brierley, a New Zealander serving in the Royal Navy who rose to the rank of lieutenant commander and was appointed a Member of the Order of the British Empire in the 1978 Queen's Birthday Honours.

== Textile career ==
In 1982, Brierley moved to New Zealand, settling in Devonport, Auckland, when her husband transferred from the Royal Navy to the Royal New Zealand Navy. Here she was finally able to enter art school, graduating in 1993 with a Diploma (Fine Arts) from Whitecliffe College of Arts and Design. Her work has been exhibited at the Barbican in London in 1995, and from November 2004 to March 2005 at the Auckland War Memorial Museum in the exhibition 'Freda Brierley – A Weaver's Tale and Historical Quilts.'

== Later life ==
Brierley's husband, Ken, died in 2023.
