= Melvin F. Chubb Jr. =

United States Air Force general

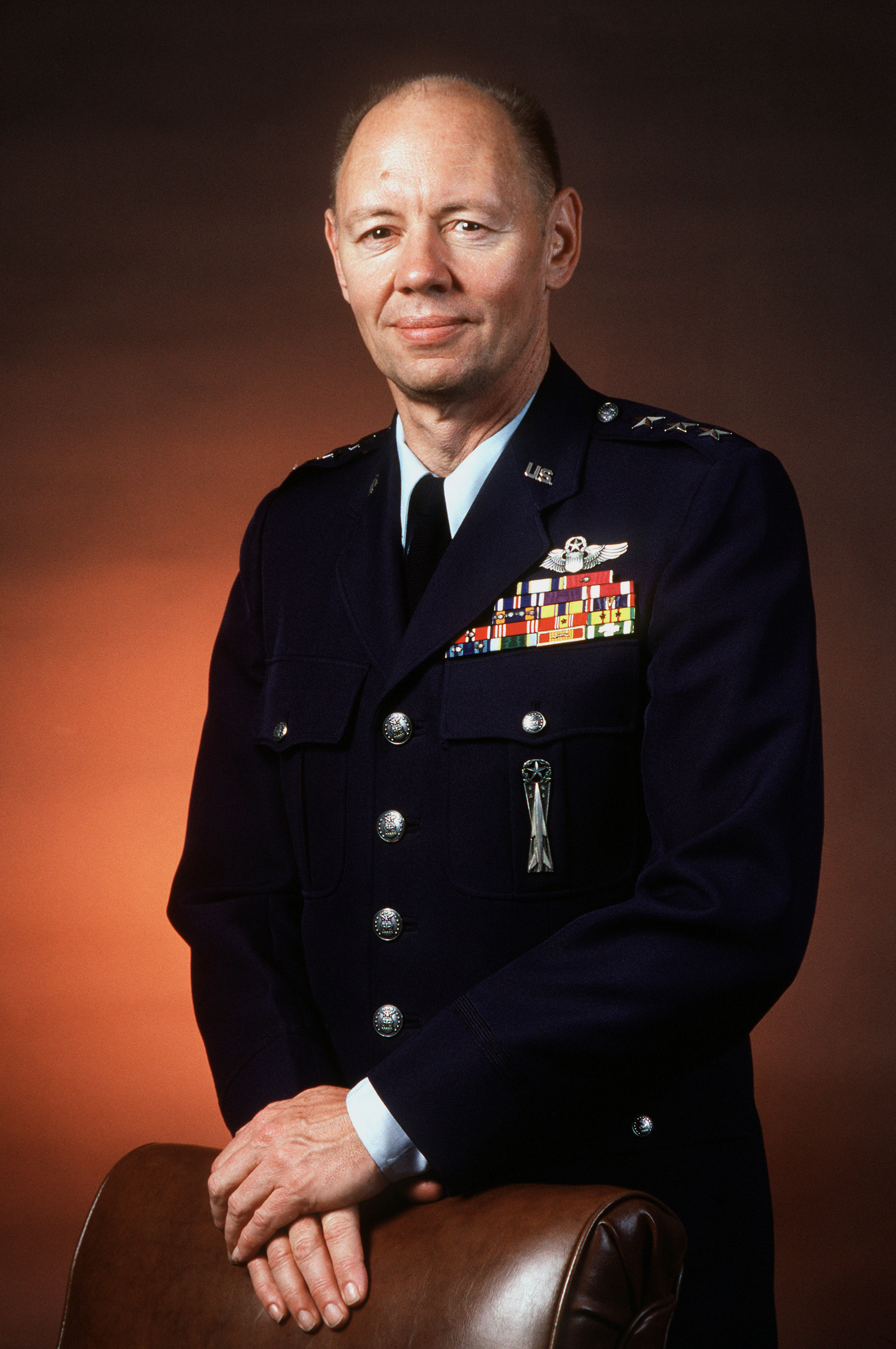
- Born: January 1, 1934; Joplin, Missouri
- Died: July 25, 2014 (aged 80); Melbourne, Florida
- Military career
- Allegiance: United States of America
- Branch: United States Air Force
- Service years: 1954–1988
- Rank: Lieutenant General
- Nickname: Nick
- Conflicts: Vietnam War

Lieutenant General Melvin Fuller Chubb Jr. (January 1, 1934 – July 25, 2014) served as commander of the Electronic Systems Division, Air Force Systems Command, Hanscom Air Force Base, Massachusetts.

Chubb was born in Joplin, Missouri, in 1934. He graduated from high school at the Wentworth Military Academy, Lexington, Missouri, in 1951 and continued his studies at the Massachusetts Institute of Technology. Chubb left school to become an aviation cadet in March 1954, but later completed a bachelor's degree in aeronautical engineering at Texas A&M University, College Station, in 1962. He earned master's degrees in astro-engineering from the University of Southern California, in 1965 and in business administration from The George Washington University, in 1972. He completed the Industrial College of the Armed Forces, Fort Lesley J. McNair, Washington, D.C., in 1972.

He was commissioned into the United States Air Force in 1955 after completing aviation cadet training. Chubb then received advanced pilot training in F-86D's and was subsequently assigned to the 54th Fighter-Interceptor Squadron at Ellsworth Air Force Base, South Dakota. After completing his degree at Texas A&M University, he was assigned to a space system program office in Space Systems Division, Los Angeles, from September 1962 to June 1966. After six months of F-100 combat crew training at Luke Air Force Base, Arizona, Chubb served a combat tour of duty as a forward air controller in the Republic of Vietnam.

Returning to Los Angeles in January 1968, Chubb was chief of the Engineering Division, Defense Systems Application System Program Office, Space and Missile Systems Organization, until August 1971. He then attended the Industrial College of the Armed Forces.

In August 1972 Chubb was assigned to Headquarters Aeronautical Systems Division at Wright-Patterson Air Force Base, Ohio, as deputy director of the AGM-65 Maverick System Program Office, and in 1973 he became program director. He transferred to Headquarters Air Force Systems Command, Andrews Air Force Base, Maryland, in January 1975 and served as assistant deputy chief of staff for systems.

He returned to Wright-Patterson Air Force Base in August 1977 and was assigned as Aeronautical Systems Division's deputy for strategic systems. While there he managed the acquisition of all Air Force aeronautical strategic systems, including B-52 weapon system improvements, B-1 research and development, the short-range attack missile program, the advanced strategic air-launched missile program, the air-launched cruise missile and the B-1B program. In January 1982 he became deputy chief of staff for systems, Air Force Systems Command headquarters, Andrews Air Force Base. He assumed command of Electronic Systems Division in August 1984.

Chubb is a command pilot with more than 5,000 flying hours and wears the missile badge. He completed 500 combat missions with 1,000 combat hours. His military decorations and awards include the Distinguished Service Medal, Legion of Merit with oak leaf cluster, Distinguished Flying Cross, Purple Heart, Meritorious Service Medal, Air Medal with 16 oak leaf clusters and Air Force Commendation Medal.

He was promoted to lieutenant general August 1, 1984, with same date of rank. He retired on October 1, 1988.

After his death in July 2014, Chubb was buried at Arlington National Cemetery on November 5, 2014.
