= Greg Whitecliffe =

New Zealand artist

Kerehi Tikihana Pararaki Wikiriwhi, also known as Greg Whitecliffe (August 4, 1954 – February 15, 2001), was an artist from New Zealand.

Whitecliffe's father was Maori and his mother was of English descent.

In 1983, Whitecliffe and his wife Michele co-founded the Whitecliffe College of Arts and Design in Auckland, New Zealand. Whitecliffe served as its president.

In 1994, he was elected a Fellow of the Royal Society of Arts in Britain.

Whitecliffe's work reflected his Maori heritage. In 1996, his work was reviewed in the New York Times as "a bewildering mix of history, anthropology, myth and reminiscence." The Fort-Worth Star Telegram described his paintings as "full of life".

He died in Auckland in 2001, at the age of 46.

His painting Pikiao is part of the permanent collection of the Vodafone Events Centre in Auckland.
