= Airborne radio relay =

Airborne radio relay is a technique employing aircraft fitted with radio relay stations for the purpose of increasing the range, flexibility, or physical security of communications systems. The aircraft may be manned or unmanned aerial vehicles.

== Use in Vietnam ==
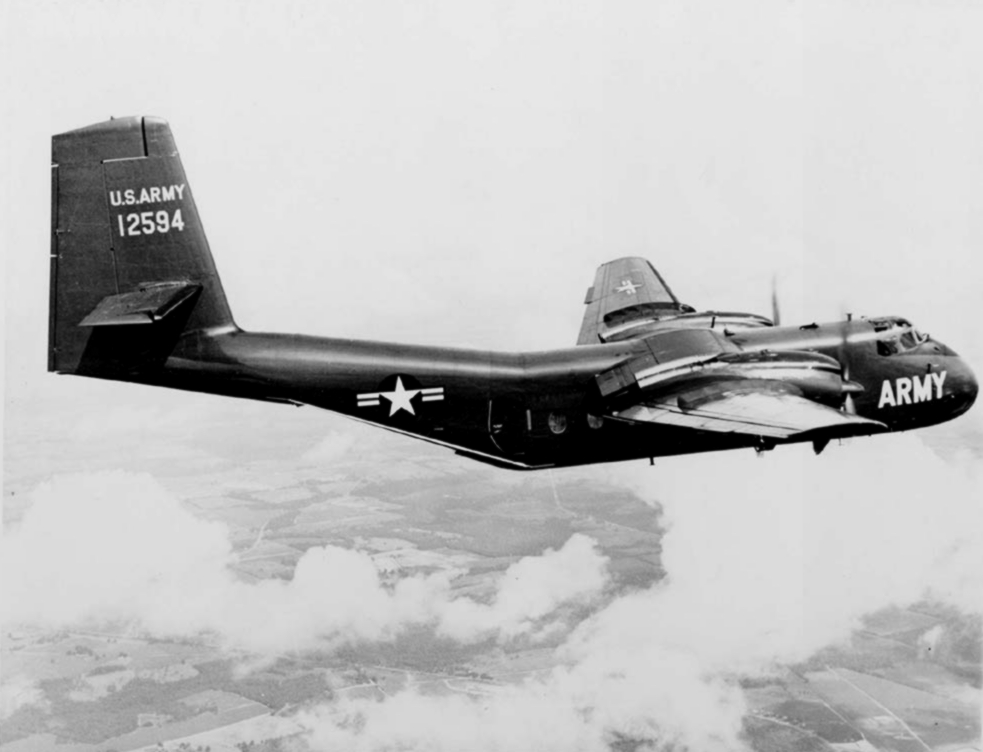
A C-7 Caribou aircraft as used by the 1st Cavalry Division for airborne radio relay.

One of the first uses of airborne radio relay was by the United States Army's 1st Cavalry Division in the Battle of Ia Drang during the Vietnam War, which employed the technique to improve communications with commanders at headquarters. The action of war had shifted to the borders of Laos and Cambodia, where the hilly terrain made the monetary and human cost of seizing and holding high ground, and airlifting and installing radio relay equipment prohibitive. In 1968, the Department of the Army provided four specially-equipped relay aircraft to the Division, which proved invaluable throughout the country, in particular, during the 1st Cavalry Division's relief of Khe Sanh in 1968.

The use of airborne radio relay was a great success, although two problems arose during the Vietnam War. The first was the limitations of the aircraft used as relays. The 1st Cavalry Division had originally used C-7 Caribous as the relay aircraft, but when these planes were turned over to the Air Force, the equipment was installed in single-engine Otter aircraft, which were too underpowered to carry the heavy equipment required for relay. Eventually, the 1st Signal Brigade was provided with six specially-equipped U-21 aircraft for use in relay operations. The second problem was that of radio frequency interference: the limited frequency spectrum in use for combat radios meant that relay aircraft often interfered with the communication of ground units when their frequencies were overridden by the airborne units. The Army eventually assigned certain frequencies for airborne relay only, although this further limited the frequencies available to ground units.

== See also ==
- Battlefield Airborne Communications Node
