= Peter E. Madden =

American politician

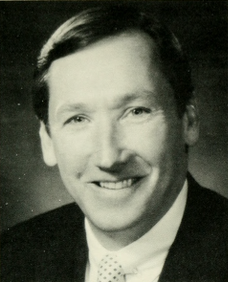
- Peter Madden in 1993

Member of the Massachusetts House of Representatives from the 14th Norfolk District
- In office 1993–1995
- Preceded by: Robert H. Marsh
- Succeeded by: John A. Locke

Personal details
- Born: March 16, 1942 (age 84) Boston, Massachusetts
- Party: Republican
- Education: Babson College; Harvard University
- Occupation: Bank President; Business consultant Politician

Peter E. Madden (born March 16, 1942, in Boston) is an American businessman and politician who served as President of State Street Bank and represented the 14th Norfolk District in the Massachusetts House of Representatives for one term (1993 to 1995).
