= James W. Stansberry =

United States Air Force general

James Wesley Stansberry
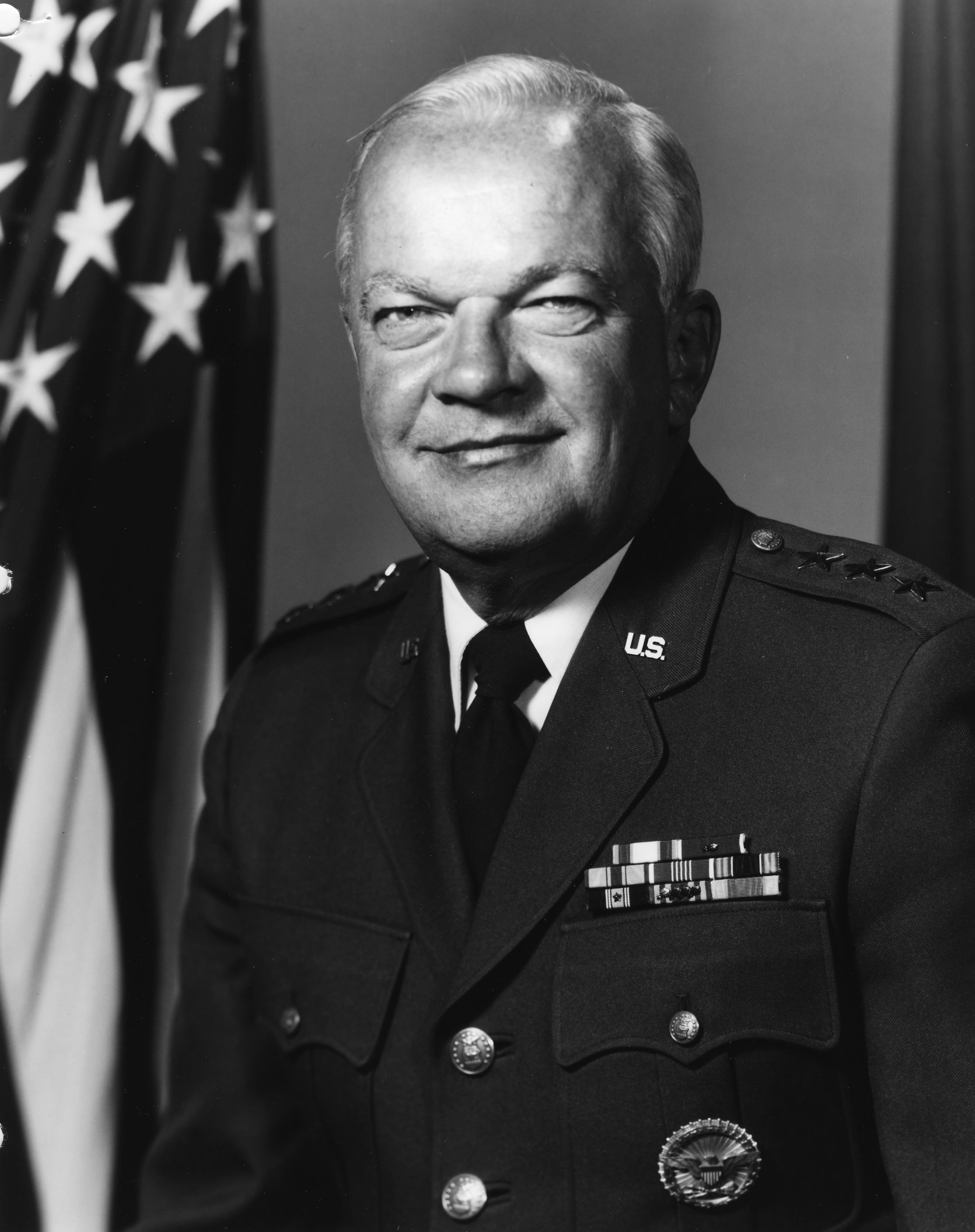
- Born: December 29, 1927; Grafton, West Virginia, U.S.
- Died: June 28, 2010 (aged 82) Virginia Beach, Virginia, U.S.
- Allegiance: United States of America
- Branch: United States Air Force
- Rank: Lieutenant General
- Awards: Air Force Distinguished Service Medal; Legion of Merit (2); Air Force Commendation Medal; Army Commendation Medal

James Wesley Stansberry (December 29, 1927 – June 28, 2010) was a United States Air Force lieutenant general and commander of the Electronic Systems Division, Air Force Systems Command, Hanscom Air Force Base, Massachusetts.

== Early life and education ==
Stansberry was born on December 29, 1927, in Grafton, West Virginia, and graduated from the United States Military Academy, West Point, New York, in 1949. He earned his Master of Business Administration degree, with distinction, in 1956 from the Air Force Institute of Technology, Wright-Patterson Air Force Base, Ohio. In conjunction with his master's studies, he was the recipient of the Mervin E. Gross and the Wall Street Journal Awards presented annually to the top graduate. He is also a graduate of the Armed Forces Staff College at Norfolk, Va.

== Career ==
Stansberry began his military career by enlisting as a private in the Army in 1945. Following graduation from the United States Military Academy, he was commissioned in the Air Force and served from September 1950 through December 1954 in the Armed Forces Special Weapons Project at Albuquerque, New Mexico.

After graduation from the Air Force Institute of Technology in September 1956, he was assigned to the Northern Air Materiel Area, Pacific, with duty as chief of production at the Kawasaki-Gifu Contract Facility at Gifu, Japan.

Stansberry was assigned as assistant professor of air science at Michigan College of Mining and Technology from April 1959 to August 1961. He then transferred to the Air University at Maxwell Air Force Base, Ala., and served on the Air Force Reserve Officers' Training Corps headquarters staff for two years.

Following graduation from the Armed Forces Staff College in January 1964, Stansberry was ordered to the Air Force Directorate of Nuclear Safety, Kirtland Air Force Base, N.M. In July 1968 he transferred to the Office of the Assistant to the Secretary of Defense (Atomic Energy) in Washington, D.C. This tour of duty culminated in his appointment as deputy assistant to the secretary of Defense (atomic energy), where he served until July 1971.

Stansberry was assigned to Air Force Systems Command headquarters, Andrews Air Force Base, Md., as a division chief and later as executive secretary for Project Acquisition Cost Evaluation, from August 1971 to August 1973. He then returned to the Pentagon and served on the Air Staff as deputy director of procurement policy. In August 1974 he was appointed deputy to the deputy assistant secretary of defense (procurement). While there he conducted a major Department of Defense study of defense contract profitability (Profit 176) which resulted in major changes to Department of Defense profit policy. From February 1977 to January 1981, he was deputy chief of staff for contracting and manufacturing, Air Force Systems Command. He assumed his last command in February 1981. He was promoted to Lieutenant General March 10, 1981, with same date of rank.

After 39 years of service, Stansberry retired on August 1, 1984.

== Later life and death ==
Stansberry died on June 28, 2010, in Virginia Beach, Virginia. He was preceded in death by his wife, Audrey Mildred Heinz; and brothers, David and William. He leaves behind daughters, Norah Stansberry of Spokane, WA, Amy and husband Rick Goodhand of Arnold, MD and Lisa and Husband Tony Porten of Chesapeake, VA. He is known as "Bapa" to his grandchildren, Adrian, Mason, Nate, Megan, Jimmy, Fitz, Cayla and Maya; and his great grandchildren, Bradan, Alison, Gunnar James, and Maverick.

== Awards and decorations ==
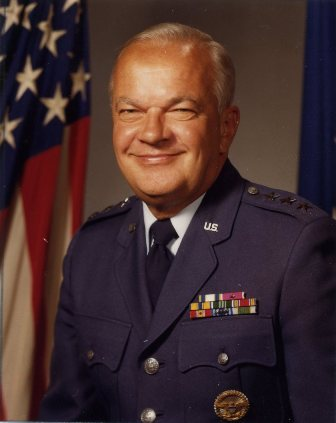

Air Force Distinguished Service Medal
Legion of Merit with oak leaf cluster
Air Force Commendation Medal
Army Commendation Medal
Unknown medal
National Defense Service Medal with service star
Air Force Longevity Service Award with 9 oak leaf clusters (36–39 years)
Small Arms Expert Marksmanship Ribbon

Office of the Secretary of Defense Identification Badge

- Mervin E. Gross Award - 1956
- Wall Street Journals Award - 1956
- Engineer of the Year, San Fernando Valley Engineers Council - 1979
- United States Air Force Order of the Sword - September 2, 1984
- Distinguished Alumni, Air Force Institute of Technology - 2008
