= Benjamin N. Bellis =

American Air Force lieutenant general (1924–2019)

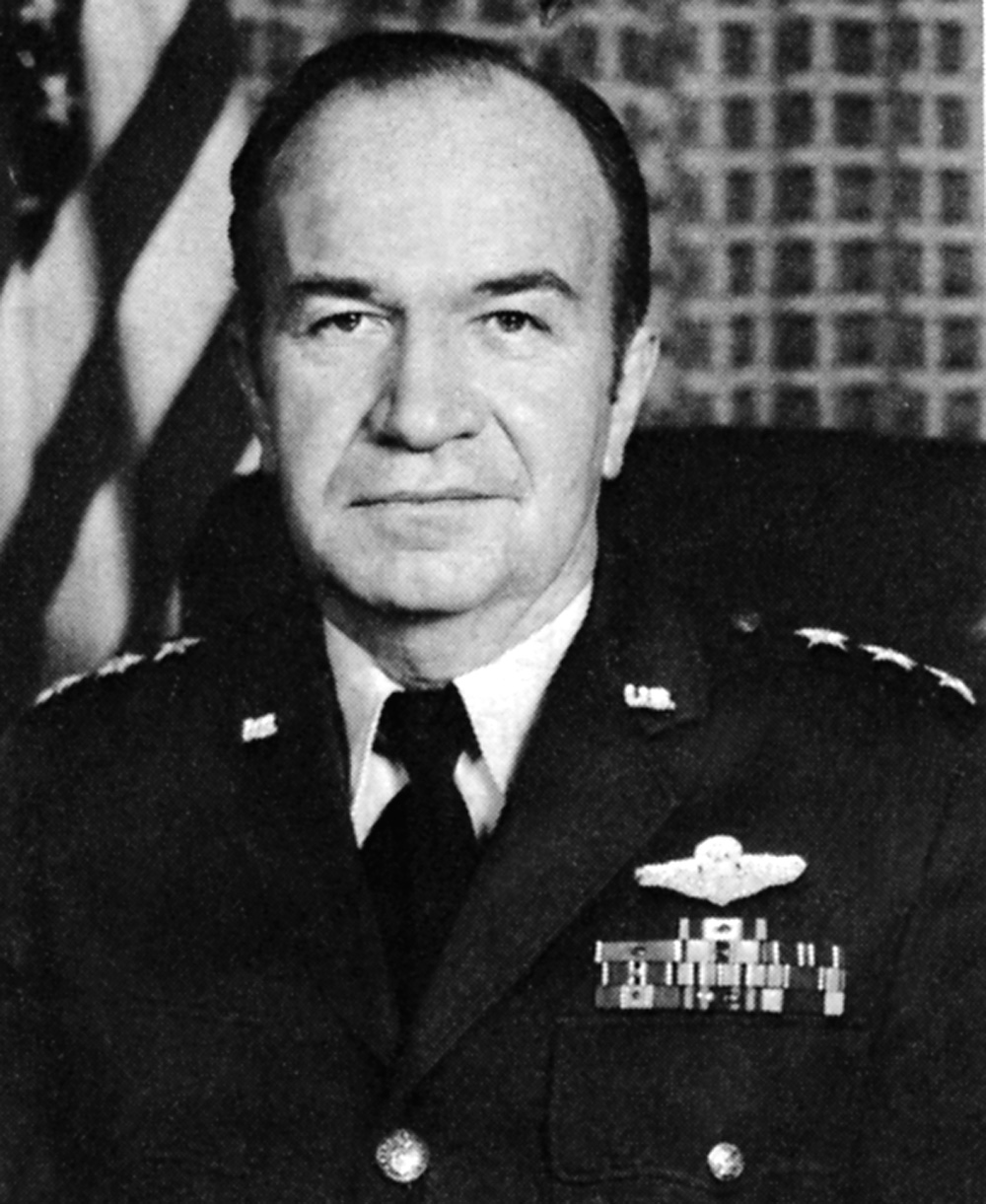
- Born: 4 February 1924; Wheatland, Wyoming, U.S.
- Died: 19 August 2019 (aged 95); Monument, Colorado, U.S.
- Education: University of Michigan
- Military career
- Allegiance: United States of America
- Branch: United States Air Force
- Service years: 1947–1981
- Rank: Lieutenant General
- Commands: Vice commander in chief, U.S. Air Forces in Europe; Electronic Systems Division
- Awards: Distinguished Service Medal with oak leaf cluster, Legion of Merit with oak leaf cluster and Air Force Commendation Medal with oak leaf cluster

Benjamin Neil Bellis (4 February 1924 – 19 August 2019) was an American Air Force lieutenant general who was vice commander in chief, U.S. Air Forces in Europe, with headquarters at Ramstein Air Base, Germany. He was also commander of the Air Force's Electronic Systems Division.

== Biography ==
Bellis was born in Wheatland, Wyoming, in 1924, and graduated from Lingle High School, in Wyoming. He graduated from the U.S. Military Academy, West Point, New York, in 1946 with a bachelor of science degree in military engineering, a commission as second lieutenant and his pilot wings. He earned a master of science degree in aeronautical engineering from the University of Michigan in 1952 and a master of science degree in business administration from The George Washington University in 1965. He also completed the executive program of the Graduate School of Business at the University of California at Berkeley.

His first assignment after graduation from the academy was with the Strategic Air Command at Fort Worth, Texas. From 1947 to 1950 he served on an Armed Forces Special Weapons Project at Sandia Base, N.M.

Following graduate studies at the University of Michigan, he served until 1957 as project officer on the TM-61B Matador weapon system in the Directorate of Systems Management, Headquarters Air Research and Development Command, Wright-Patterson Air Force Base, Ohio.

Upon graduation from the Air Command and Staff College, Maxwell Air Force Base, Alabama, in 1958, he served in various executive positions in the Thor ballistic missile development program with the Ballistic Missiles Division of Air Research and Development Command. In January 1960 he was appointed chairman of the configuration control board for the Atlas ballistic missile program.

In August 1961 he was assigned to Headquarters Air Force Systems Command, Andrews Air Force Base, Maryland, where he was involved in systems management policy. In August 1964 he entered the Industrial College of the Armed Forces at Fort Lesley J. McNair, Washington, D.C.

In August 1965 Bellis was assigned to the Aeronautical Systems Division, Wright-Patterson Air Force Base, where he served as deputy director and as director of the F-12/SR-71 Systems Program Office. In July 1968 he became deputy for reconnaissance and electronic warfare, and in July 1969 was appointed director for the F-15 system program.

Bellis became commander of the Electronic Systems Division of the Air Force Systems Command at L.G. Hanscom Air Force Base, Massachusetts, in March 1974. He was transferred in November 1974 as commander, Seventeenth Air Force with headquarters at Sembach Air Base, Germany.

Bellis became the commander of Sixth Allied Tactical Air Force with headquarters at Izmir, Turkey, in June 1977. He assumed the position of vice commander in chief, US Air Forces in Europe on 27 July 1978.

He held the aeronautical rating of command pilot and was awarded the Master Missileman Badge. His military decorations and awards included the Distinguished Service Medal with oak leaf cluster, Legion of Merit with oak leaf cluster and Air Force Commendation Medal with oak leaf cluster. Also, while program director, his units were awarded the Air Force Outstanding Unit Award (F-12/SR-71) and the Air Force Organizational Excellence Award (F-15). In addition, Bellis was recognized with the Air Force Association Wright Memorial Chapter Aerospace Power Award (1973) and the Air Force Association Distinguished Award for Management (1974).

He was promoted to the grade of lieutenant general 1 July 1977, with date of rank 27 June 1977. He retired 1 August 11981 and died on 19 August 2019.
