= Hiria Anderson =

New Zealand artist

- Born: 1974 (age 51–52); Ōtorohanga, New Zealand
- Education: Te Wānanga o Aotearoa, Whitecliffe College of Art and Design
- Known for: Painting

Hiria Anderson is a New Zealand artist whose work focuses on Māori culture in the 21st century. In 2018 she was awarded the New Zealand Paint and Printmaking award and her work has been exhibited at the Auckland Art Gallery, Te Tuhi and Tim Melville Gallery.

== Biography ==
Anderson was born in 1974 within the King Country, New Zealand. She grew up at her grandparents home in Ōtorohanga, next to the wharenui her grandfather built when she was born. Her grandfather was a carver and her grandmother was a weaver, they played an influence on Anderson's developing art practice. Anderson attended Queen Victoria School, a historic girls' boarding school for Māori in Parnell, Auckland.

She studied at Te Wānanga o Aotearoa, graduating with a Diploma of Visual Arts in 1998. During this time, Anderson was an active member of Ngā Puna Waihanga o Tainui, the Māori Artists and Writers' Society of Tainui, and trained under artist James Ormsby. She gained an MFA with first class honours from Whitecliffe College of Art and Design in 2016.

Her work has been shown at Auckland Art Gallery and was included in the exhibition 'Toi Tū Toi Ora', the largest art exhibition held by the gallery since 1989.

She is currently based in her whānau homestead in Ōtorohanga, where she produces art from a small studio. Anderson affiliates with the iwi, Rereahu, Ngāti Maniapoto and Ngāti Apakura.

== Artistry ==
Anderson describes her work as painting 'the everyday lives of people in my community, paying particular attention to relationships amongst family members, intertribal relationships, politics and environments that show the nuance between culture and 21st century life.' Most of her artworks depict everyday scenes of the township of Ōtorohanga. Anderson has been praised for her use of chiaroscuro, and her framing of everyday objects; and likened to the artists of the Dutch and Flemish Renaissance.

== Exhibitions ==
- A Girl Like Me, 2009
- A Painter on Turongo Street, 2017
- Ahi Kā, 2019
- Te Ao Hurihuri – At the end of the Beginning, 2020
- Under the Radar with Margaret Aull, 2020
- Hohou Te Rongo: A Strategy towards Health & Wellbeing, 2021
