= Edward Marsh =

Edward Marsh may refer to:

- Edward Marsh (cricketer) (1865–1926), British cricketer
- Edward Marsh (polymath) (1872–1953), British polymath, translator, arts patron and civil servant
- Edward Marsh (rower) (born 1874), American Olympic rower
- Edward Garrard Marsh (1783–1862), English poet and Anglican clergyman
- Eddie Marsh (bishop), Canadian bishop

== See also ==
- Eddie Marsh (footballer) (1927–2010), Scottish footballer
- Edward Marsh Williams (1818–1909), British missionary
- Edwin Marsh (1899–1968), Australian rules footballer
