= John A. Locke =

American politician

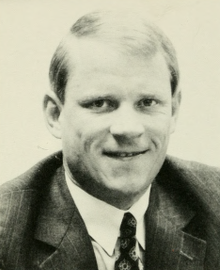
- Portrait of John A. Locke

Member of the Massachusetts House of Representatives from the 14th Norfolk district
- In office 1995–2003
- Preceded by: Peter E. Madden
- Succeeded by: Alice Peisch

Personal details
- Born: November 27, 1962 (age 63) Newton, Massachusetts
- Party: Republican
- Education: American University (BA); Suffolk University (JD)
- Occupation: Attorney; Farmer; Politician

John A. Locke (born November 27, 1962, in Newton, Massachusetts) is an American attorney, farmer, and politician who represented the 14th Norfolk District in the Massachusetts House of Representatives from 1995 to 2003.
