= 653d Electronic Systems Wing =

653d Electronic Systems Wing
- Active: 1956–1994; 2004–present
- Country: United States
- Branch: United States Air Force
- Role: Electronic Systems Research and Development
- Part of: Air Force Materiel Command
- Garrison/HQ: Hanscom Air Force Base, Massachusetts
- Motto: Always There (c. 1982-1990)
- Decorations: Air Force Outstanding Unit Award

Commanders
- Director: Ronald A. Mason

Insignia
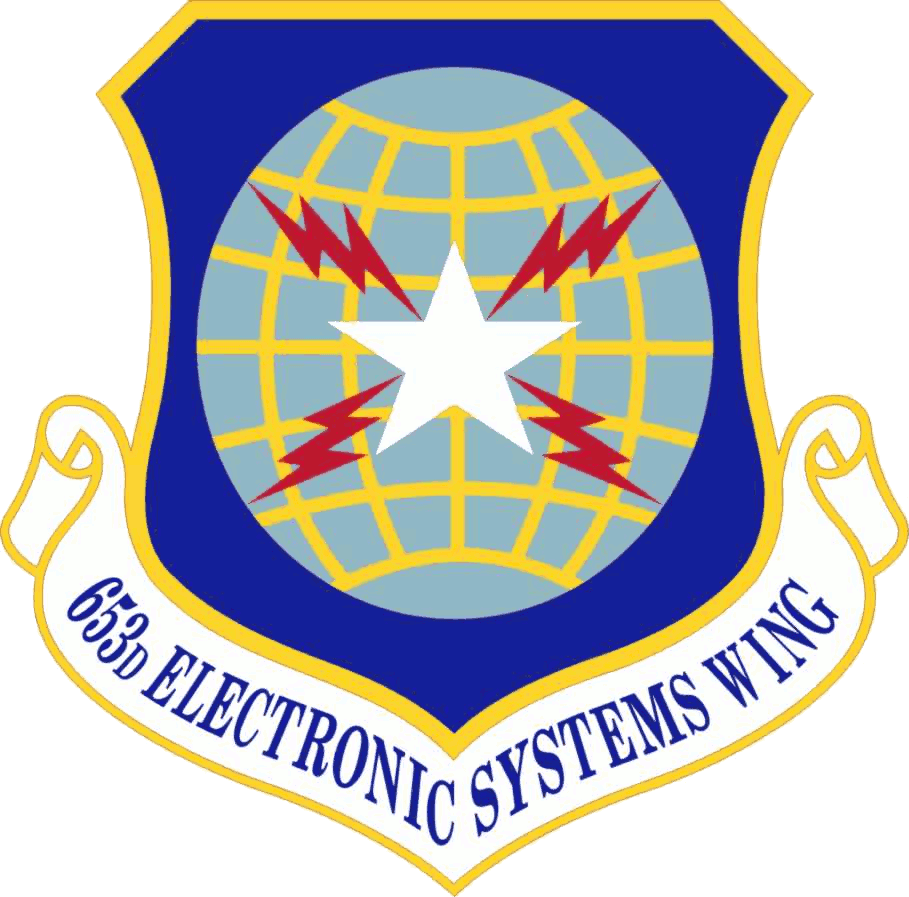
- 653d Electronic Systems Wing emblem (Note: Approved 9 April 1991.)

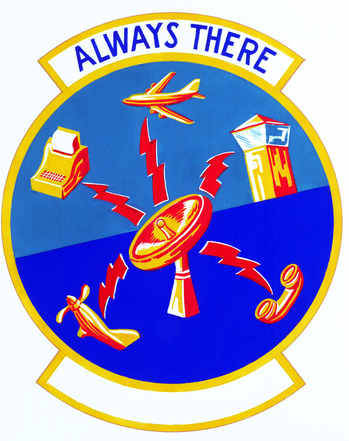
- 1926th Communications Squadron emblem

The 653d Electronic Systems Wing is a wing of the United States Air Force located at Hanscom Air Force Base, Massachusetts.

== Mission ==
The 653d Electronic Systems Wing executes a $21 billion fiscal year defense plan budget with 1,300 personnel. The 653 ELSW acquires, delivers and sustains Air Force and Joint systems to include communications, intelligence and airspace management capabilities supporting AF Global Continuous Operations. Additionally, the wing provides engineering and integration to optimize delivery of net-centric capabilities to warfighter for effects-based combat operations and support. The wing serves 9 major commands, 4 Services, 7 Combatant Commands (COCOM), 14 national agencies, and NATO.

== Units ==
From 2004 to 2010 the 653rd Wing consisted of three groups with four squadrons: The 653d Electronic Systems Group, the 753d Electronic Systems Group, the 853d Electronic Systems Group, the 639th Electronic Systems Squadron, the 640th Electronic Systems Squadron, the 641th Electronic Systems Squadron, and the 644th Electronic Systems Squadron.

The 653d Electronic Systems Group executed a $18 billion Fiscal Year Defense Plan budget with six divisions and squadrons. The group had 720 personnel. The 653 ELSG acquired, delivered and sustained networks, integrated information systems, enterprise services and applications for the Global Information Grid, facilitating communication between land, naval, air and space warfare forces. The group delivered capabilities for voice, video and data networks focused on joint and coalition warfighter needs to enable worldwide net-centric ops.

The 753d Electronic Systems Group executed a $500 million Fiscal Year Defense Plan budget with 350 personnel. The group was the ESC lead for AF and joint capabilities, planning and enterprise integration. The 753 ELSG leveraged $14 billion Air Force combat and command budget in support of net-centric operations, performed XR staff functions, and identified technical opportunities through management of experiments and simulations. Additionally the group acquired, fielded and sustained interoperable C2 capabilities; implemented C2 net-centric integration with all commands and services.

The 853d Electronic Systems Group executed a $2.6 billion Fiscal Year Defense Plan budget with 260 personnel. The group acquired, fielded and sustained mission critical fixed and deployable airborne, space and ground-based Communication, navigation and surveillance/Air Traffic Management and landing systems. The group also certified CNS/ATM systems to meet warfighting requirements for access to global airspace vital to AF Global Attack, Rapid Global Mobility and joint operations worldwide.

== History ==
The wing was last active on 1 October 1994, after being redesignated the 653d Communications-Computer Systems Group on 1 October 1992 at Robins Air Force Base, Georgia. The redesignated Wing activated in November 2005 at Hanscom Air Force Base as the Network Centric Operations and Integration Systems Wing. It received its present designation after the two units were consolidated in 2006.

== Lineage ==
653d Communications-Computer Systems Group

- Designated as the 1926th Airways and Air Communications Squadron and organized on 18 February 1956 (Note: This squadron is not related to a previous 1926th Airways and Air Communications Squadron that was designated as the 152d Airways and Air Communications Squadron on 14 May 1948, organized on 1 June 1948 at Robins Air Force Base, redesignated 1926th Airways and Air Communications Squadron on 1 October 1948, and discontinued on 1 November 1954. See Mueller, p. 506)

Redesignated 1926th Communications Squadron on 1 July 1961
Redesignated 1926th Communications and Installation Group on 30 June 1977
Redesignated 1926th Communications Squadron on 1 June 1981
Redesignated 1926th Information Systems Squadron on 1 January 1986
Redesignated 1926th Communications Squadron on 1 November 1986
Redesignated 1926th Communications-Computer Systems Group on 1 October 1990
Redesignated 653d Communications-Computer Systems Group on 1 October 1992
Inactivated on 1 October 1994

- Consolidated on 6 May 2006 with the 653d Electronic Systems Wing as the 653d Electronic Systems Wing

653d Electronic Systems Wing

- Constituted as the Network Centric Operations/Integration Systems Wing on 23 November 2004

Activated on 17 December 2004
Redesignated 653d Electronic Systems Wing on 17 April 2006

- Consolidated on 6 May 2006 with the 653d Communications-Computer Systems Group

=== Assignments ===
- 1803d Airways and Air Communications System Group (later Southeastern Airways and Air Communications System Region, Southeastern Communications Region): 18 February 1956
- Eastern Communications Region: 1 July 1963
- Southern Communications Area: 1 May 1970
- Continental Communications Division: 1 June 1981
- Logistics Information Systems Division (later Logistics Communications Division): 1 January 1986
- Warner Robins Air Logistics Center: 1 October 1990 – 1 October 1994
- Electronic Systems Center: 17 December 2004 – present

== Subordinate Units ==
- Global Information Grid Systems Group (later 653rd Electronic Systems Group), 17 December 2004 – 30 June 2010

639 Electronic Systems Squadron, 17 April 2006 – 30 June 2010
640 Electronic Systems Squadron, 17 April 2006 – 30 June 2010

- Enterprise Integration Systems Group (later 753rd Electronic Systems Group), 17 December 2004 – 30 June 2010

644 Electronic Systems Squadron, 17 April 2006 – 30 June 2010

- Global Air Traffic Systems Group (later 853rd Electronic Systems Group), 17 December 2004 – 30 June 2010

641 Electronic Systems Squadron, 17 April 2006 – 30 June 2010

=== Stations ===
- Robins Air Force Base, Georgia, 18 February 1956 – 1 October 1994
- Hanscom Air Force Base, Massachusetts, 17 December 2004 – present
