= 554th Electronic Systems Wing =

554th Electronic Systems Wing
- Active: 1943-1945; 1980-1991; 2004-2010
- Country: United States
- Branch: United States Air Force
- Part of: Air Force Materiel Command; Electronic Systems Center
- Garrison/HQ: Hanscom Air Force Base
- Decorations: Air Force Outstanding Unit Award

Insignia
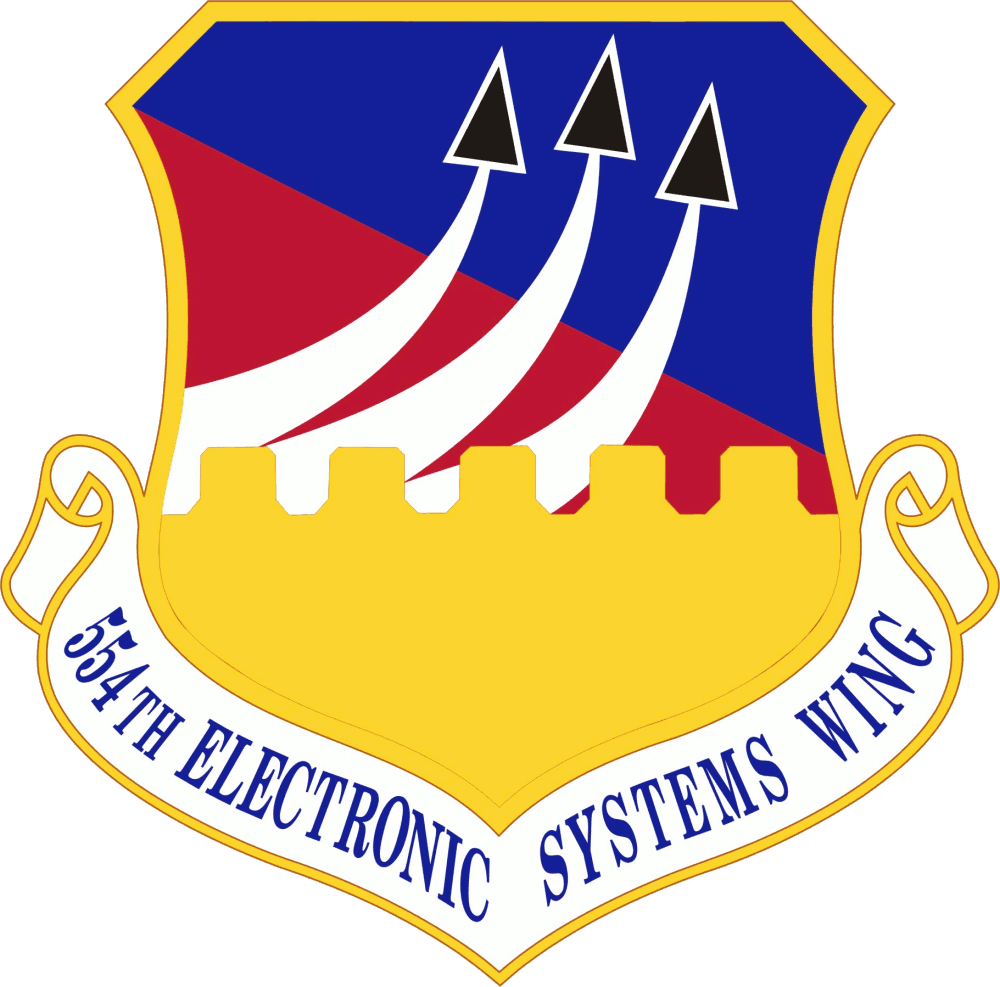
- 554th Electronic Systems Wing Emblem (approved 17 December 1980)

The 554th Electronic Systems Wing (554 ELSW) is an inactive wing of the United States Air Force. It was last stationed at Hanscom Air Force Base, Massachusetts, where it was inactivated in 2010.

== History ==
=== World War II ===
The wing was first activated in Northern Ireland under VII Air Force Composite Command as the 3d Combat Crew Replacement Center Group. It used Martin B-26 Marauders and Douglas A-20 Havocs to provide combat and theater indoctrination for Eighth Air Force combat crews from November 1943 until September 1944, when the need for dedicated Army Air Forces training units in the United Kingdom was reduced.

The group's resources were used to man and equip provisional air disarmament units participating in Operation Lusty. These units moved to France in February 1945 and advanced with Allied ground forces, seizing, securing, inventorying, and disposing of captured Luftwaffe equipment and materiel through October 1945. The group inactivated the following month. It was disbanded in the fall of 1948.

=== Support for Nellis Air Force Base and the Continental Range ===
The group was reconstituted as the 554th Operations Support Wing in 1980. It provided base support functions for Nellis Air Force Base, Nevada and its associated ranges from 1980 to 1991. The wing developed, operated, and maintained all range facilities and threat simulators and provided combat support functions at Indian Springs Air Force Auxiliary Field.

=== Systems Management ===
The 554th Electronic Systems Wing was consolidated in 2006 with the Operations Support Systems Wing, which had been established in 2004 at Hanscom AFB, Massachusetts. The wing was inactivated in June 2010.

== Lineage ==
554th Operations Support Wing

- Constituted on 2 November 1943 as the 3d Combat Crew Replacement Center Group

Activated on 21 November 1943
Redesignated 3d Combat Crew Replacement Center Group (Bomber or Fighter, Special) on 17 July 1944
Inactivated on 22 November 1945

- Disbanded on 8 October 1948
- Reconstituted on 26 February 1980 and redesignated 554th Operations Support Wing

Activated on 1 March 1980
Inactivated on 1 November 1991
Consolidated on 6 April 2006 with the Operations Support Systems Wing

554th Electronic Systems Wing

- Constituted as the Operations Support Systems Wing on 23 November 2004

Activated on 17 December 2004
Consolidated on 6 April 2006 with the 554th Operations Support Wing
Redesignated as the 554th Electronics Systems Wing on 17 April 2006
Inactivated on 30 June 2010

=== Assignments ===
- VIII Air Force Composite Command, 21 November 1943
- Air Disarmament Command (Provisional), ca. 23 September 1944
- VIII Air Force Composite Command, 10 October 1944 (attached to Air Disarmament Command (Provisional) until 31 January 1945)
- IX Air Force Service Command, 1 February 1945
- 1587th Quartermaster Battalion, Mobile (Aviation), 16 October 1945
- Detachment B, 9th Base Air Depot Area, 12 November 1945 – 22 November 1945
- USAF Tactical Fighter Weapons Center (later USAF Fighter Weapons Center), 1 March 1980 – 1 November 1991
- Electronic Systems Center, 17 December 2004 – 30 June 2010

=== Stations ===
- RAF Toome (AAF 236), Northern Ireland, 21 November 1943
- RAF Chipping Ongar (AAF 162), England, September 1944
- Vittel, France, by 15 March 1945
- Öhringen, Germany, by 30 April 1945
- Schwetzingen, Germany, by 1 May 1945
- Fillingen, Germany, by 15 May 1945
- Nellingen, Germany, by 31 May 1945
- Kaufbeuren, Germany (R-70), 15 October 1945
- Leipheim, Germany (R-59), ca. 31 October 1945 – 22 November 1945
- Nellis Air Force Base, Nevada, 1 March 1980 – 1 November 1991
- Hanscom Air Force Base, Massachusetts, 17 December 2004 – 30 June 2010

=== Components ===
Groups

- 554th Combat Support Group, 1 March 1980 – 1 November 1991
- 554th Electronic Systems Group, 17 April 2006 – 30 June 2010
- USAF Hospital, Nellis (later 554th Medical Group), 1 March 1980 – 1 November 1991
- 554th Range Group, 1 March 1980 – 1 November 1991
- 554th Security Police Group, 1 March 1980 – 1 November 1991
- 754th Electronic Systems Group, 17 April 2006 – 30 June 2010
- 2069th Communications Group (later 554th Communications Group, 554th Communications Squadron), 1 September 1990 – 1 November 1991

Operational Squadrons

- 3d Replacement and Training Squadron (later 3d Replacement and Training Squadron, CCRC Group (Bombardment)), 21 November 1943 – 22 November 1945 (not operational after 10 October 1945)
- 4460th Helicopter Squadron, 1 June 1985 – 31 December 1987

Indian Springs Air Force Auxiliary Airfield, Nevada

Systems Squadrons

- Engineering and Integration Systems Squadron (later 643d Electronic Systems Squadron) 17 December 2004 – 30 June 2010

Gunter Annex, Alabama

Support Squadrons

- 554th Combat Support Squadron, 1 March 1986 – 31 December 1987
- 554th Supply Squadron, 1 March 1980 – 1 November 1991
- 554th Transportation Squadron, 1 March 1980 – 1 November 1991

Indian Springs Air Force Auxiliary Airfield, Nevada

=== Aircraft ===
- Douglas A-20 Havoc, 1944
- Martin B-26 Marauder, 1943–1944
- Fairchild AT-23, 1944
- Bell UH-1N Huey, 1985–1987

=== Awards and campaigns ===
Award streamer	Award	Dates	Notes
	Air Force Outstanding Unit Award	1 July 1983-30 June 1985	554th Operational Support Wing
	Air Force Outstanding Unit Award	1 July 1985-30 June 1987	554th Operational Support Wing
	Air Force Outstanding Unit Award	1 July 1987-30 June 1989	554th Operations Support Wing
	Air Force Outstanding Unit Award	1 July 1989-30 Jun e1991	554th Operations Support Wing

Campaign Streamer	Campaign	Dates	Notes
	Rhineland	5 September 1944 – 21 March 1945	3d Combat Crew Replacement Center Group
	Central Europe	22 March 1944 – 21 May 1945	3d Combat Crew Replacement Center Group

== See also ==
Advanced Landing Ground
