= James Marsh =

James, Jim, Jimmy, or Jamie Marsh may refer to:

== Arts and entertainment ==
- James Randall Marsh (1896–1965), American artist
- Jimmy Jewel (James Arthur Thomas Jewel Marsh, 1909–1995), English comedian and actor
- James Marsh (director) (born 1963), British film director
- Jamie Marsh (born 1966), American actor

== Sports ==
- James Holt Marsh (1865–1928), English rugby union footballer
- James Marsh (cricketer) (1870–1930), English cricketer
- Jim Marsh (basketball) (1946–2019), American basketball player
- Jim Marsh (ice hockey) (born 1951), Canadian ice hockey player
- Jim Marsh (American football), American football coach

== Others ==
- James Marsh (British Army officer) (died 1804), British army general
- James Marsh (philosopher) (1794–1842), American transcendentalist philosopher
- James Marsh (chemist) (1794–1846), British chemist
- James Marsh (priest) (1848–?), English Anglican priest
- James Barney Marsh (1856–1936), American engineer and bridge designer
- James Harley Marsh (born 1943), Canadian editor and writer
