= Battlefield Airborne Communications Node =

US Air Force airborne communications relay and gateway system

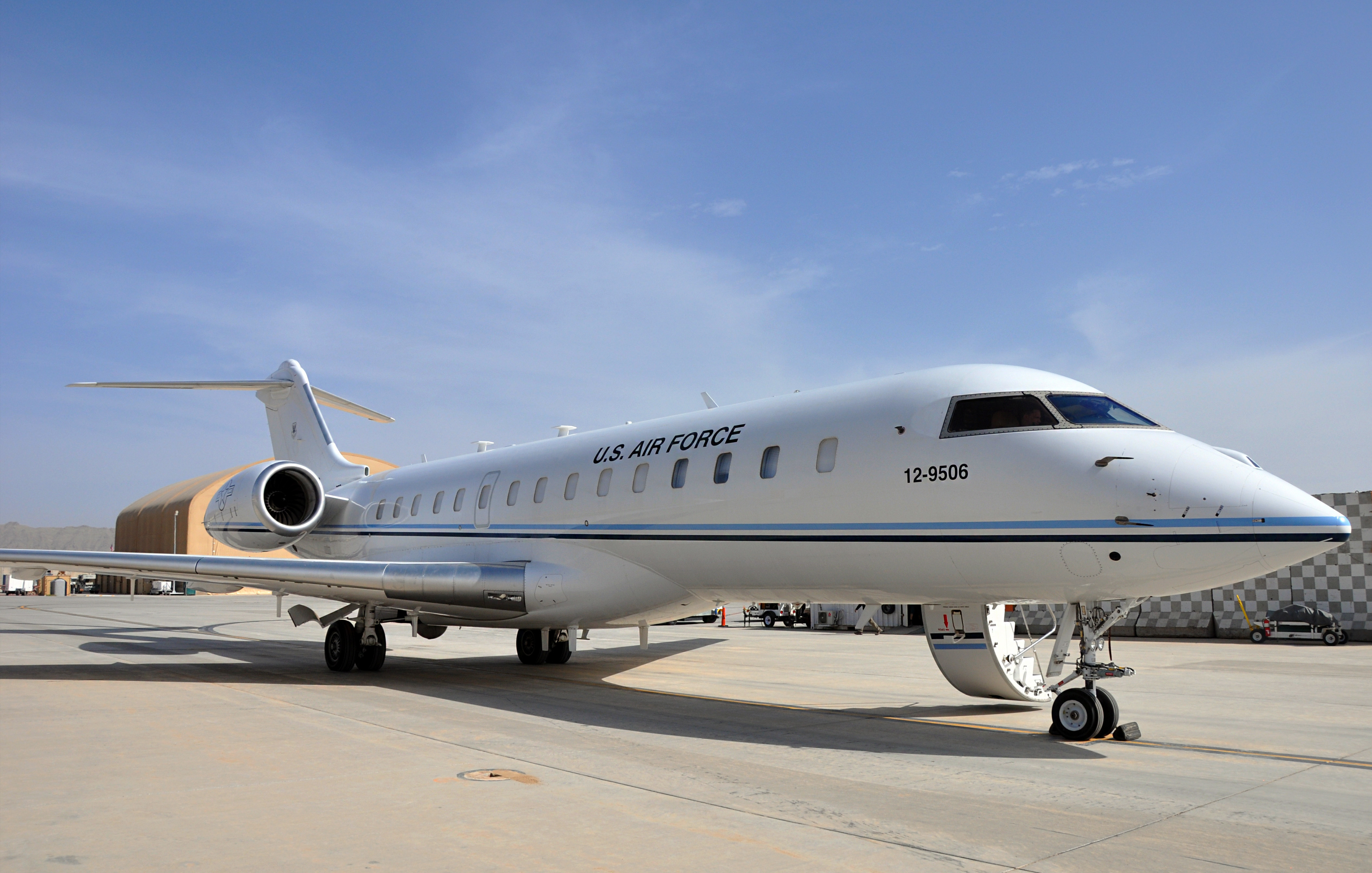
A Bombardier E-11A at Kandahar International Airport in April 2019.

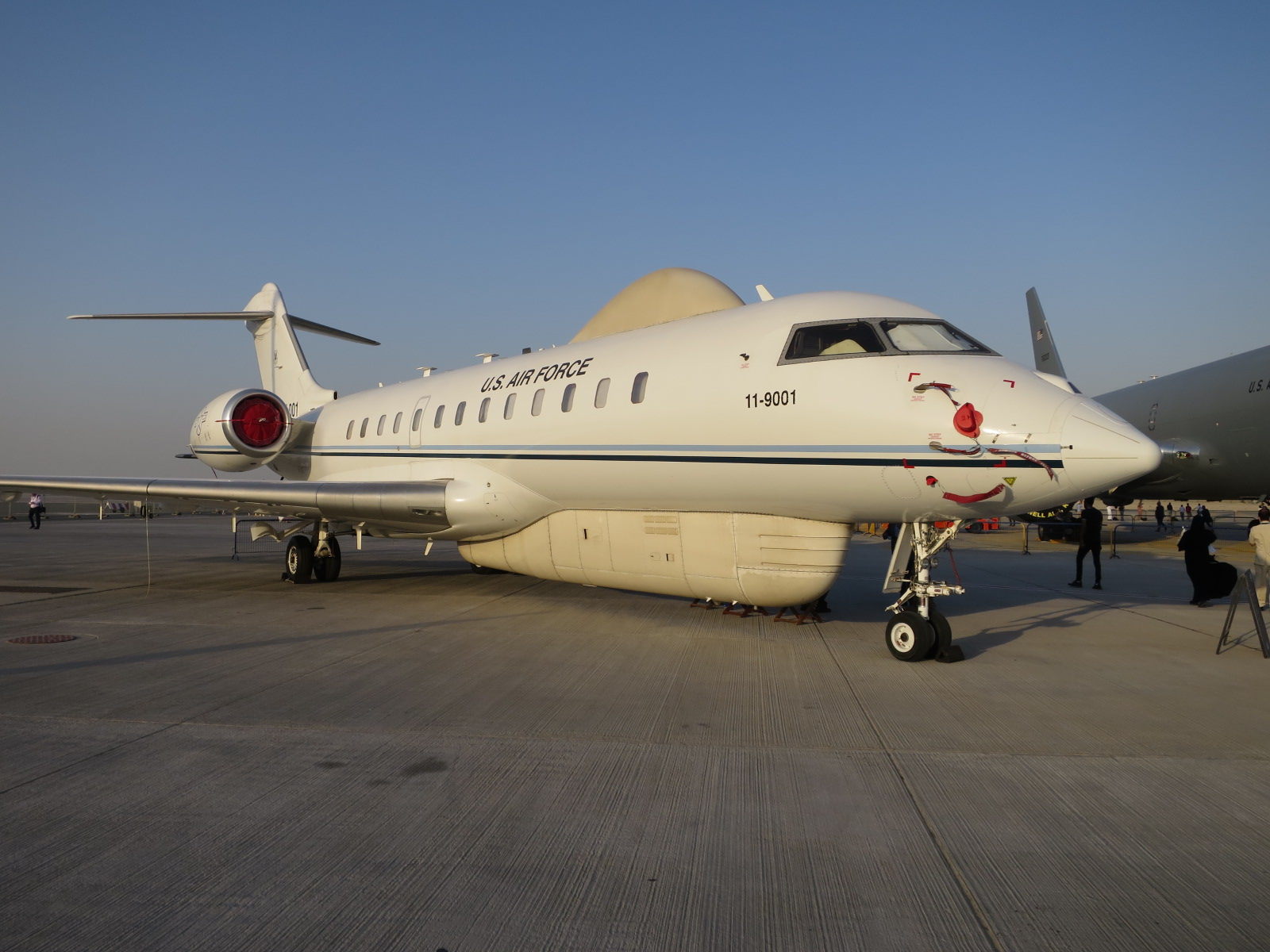
E-11A 11–9001 at Dubai Airshow 2021

The Battlefield Airborne Communications Node (BACN) is a United States Air Force (USAF) airborne communications relay and gateway system carried by the unmanned EQ-4B and the manned Bombardier E-11A aircraft. BACN enables real-time information flow across the battlespace between similar and dissimilar tactical data link and voice systems through relay, bridging, and data translation in line-of-sight and beyond-line-of-sight situations. Its ability to translate between dissimilar communications systems allows them to interoperate without modification.

Because of its flexible deployment options and ability to operate at high altitudes, BACN can enable air and surface forces to overcome communications difficulties caused by mountains, other rough terrain, or distance. BACN provides critical information to all operational echelons and increases situational awareness by converging tactical and operational air and ground pictures. For example, an Army unit on the ground currently sees a different picture than an aircrew, but with BACN, both can see the same picture.

== Purpose ==
Individual tactical data links, such as Link 16 and EPLRS, are part of the larger tactical data link network, encompassing tactical data links, common data links, and weapon data links. Most military platforms or units are equipped with a tactical data link capability tailored to their individual missions. Those tactical data link capabilities are not necessarily interoperable with one another, preventing the digital exchange of information between military units. BACN acts as a universal translator, or gateway, that makes the tactical data links work with one another. BACN also serves as an airborne repeater, connecting tactical data link equipped military units that are not within line of sight of one another.

== Background ==
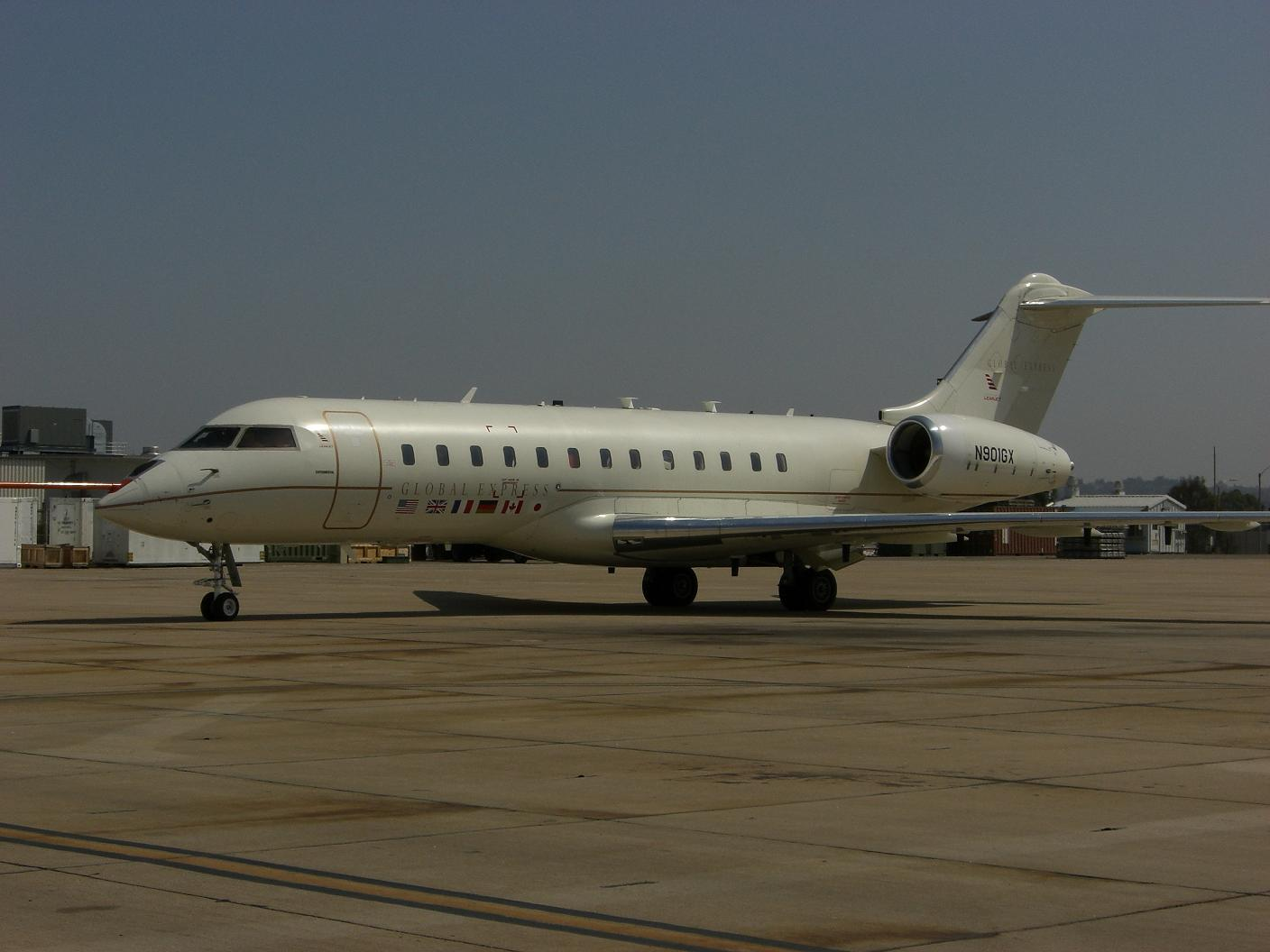
Bombardier Global 6000 aircraft configured as a BACN aircraft, August 2007

Interoperability between airborne networking waveforms has been a persistent challenge. There have been multiple systems developed to address the challenge to include Air Defense Systems Integrator (ADSI), Gateway Manager, and Joint Range Extension (JRE) product lines. However, those product lines were separately funded/maintained and had interoperability concerns of their own. The solution was an "Objective Gateway" which would serve as a Universal Translator to make data from one network interoperable with another.

In 2005, the USAF's AFC2ISRC and ESC created BACN as an Objective Gateway technology demonstrator to provide voice and data interoperability between aircraft in a single battle area. The four key principles were

- radio agnostic - it would support a variety of communication protocols
- platform agnostic - BACN could be mounted on a variety of aircraft
- un-tethered - unlike previous repeaters, which were hung from floating aerostats, BACN has the ability to move within the battlespace
- Knowledge-based intelligence - the ability to sense waveform characteristics of sender and receiver and automatically route traffic.

The BACN first flight was November 2005 at MCAS Miramar in San Diego, CA.

BACN was successfully demonstrated in Joint Expeditionary Force eXperiment (JEFX) 2006 and JEFX 2008 and selected for field deployment.

== Joint support ==
Getting critical air support to troops in contact with the enemy supports both troops on the ground and in the air.

This project is not limited to combat operations. It has provided the World Food convoy commander with “comms-on-the-move.” This capability allows convoys to stay in continuous contact with air support and with command channels in complex or adverse terrain, while mitigating exposure to attacks as the node is continually moving.

== Platforms ==
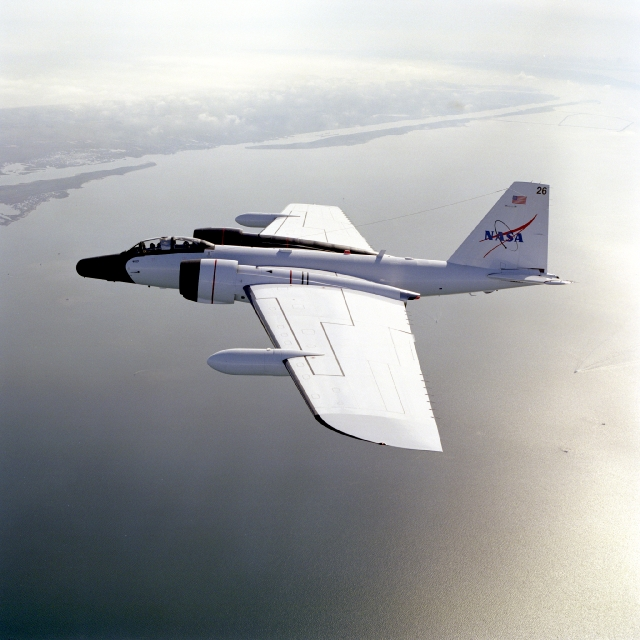
NASA WB-57 as BACN Aircraft, typically above 55,000 feet

The BACN prototype was originally developed and tested in 2005–2008 on the NASA WB-57 high altitude test aircraft during Joint Expeditionary Force Experiments and other experimentation venues. The last two flying WB-57s were used for this mission in Afghanistan.

BACN was also deployed for testing on a Bombardier Global 6000 and originally designated as the RC-700A under a reconnaissance classification. The aircraft was later re-designated as the E-11A under the special electronics installation category. The Global 6000 was selected due to its high service ceiling (up to 51,000 ft) and long flight duration (up to 12 hours). These flight characteristics are critical in providing unified datalink and voice networks in the mountainous terrain encountered in the current theater of operations.

Additional E-11As have been deployed to increase availability and flexibility. These have been used in operations in Afghanistan.

BACN payloads have also been developed, installed, and operated on special variant EQ-4B Global Hawk aircraft to provide unmanned long endurance high altitude communications coverage. The combination of BACN payloads on E-11A and EQ-4 aircraft gives planners and operators flexibility to adapt to mission needs and increase coverage in the battlespace to near 24/7 operations. The effectiveness of BACN has increased the demand for more EQ-4B Global Hawk aircraft to be created and installed with BACN to be utilized in the field. The BACN system continues to be a high in-demand system that the Air Force will more than likely continue to use for many years to come.

Northrop Grumman has also developed BACN pods that can be temporarily mounted to other various aircraft.

== BACN as a concept ==
BACN has been a controversial program within the DoD. This is caused by a number of issues including the personality clashes between the service people who conceived the project back in late 2004 and the traditional acquisition bureaucracy. This was particularly true between requirements developers at the former Air Force Command and Control Intelligence, Surveillance, Reconnaissance Center at Langley AFB, Virginia and their acquisition partners at the Electronic Systems Center (ESC) at Hanscom AFB, Massachusetts, part of Air Force Materiel Command.

BACN divides military planners and acquisition bureaucrats on two main fronts. First, how will an "Airborne Network" evolve beyond the existing tactical data links on today's platforms. Second, the BACN effort presupposes that the capability will initially be "outsourced" to commercial companies that will provide an "airborne network" as a service to the DOD for the foreseeable future.

== Future ==
With the increasing likelihood of a contested electromagnetic spectrum (EMS) in an era of great power competition, the idea of a "BACN-mesh" was proposed by Professor Jahara Matisek (and former E-11 BACN pilot) at the US Air Force Academy, as a way of pursuing new multi-domain war-fighting options against near-peers. Specifically, Prof. Matisek suggests that smart node pods (i.e. a BACN-light payloads affixed to aircraft with hardpoints), could provided layered BACN “bridging” connections and Tactical Data Link (TDL) services to war-fighters in an EMS-contested battlespace, without deploying a specific BACN aircraft. For example, in the Pacific – where infrastructure is limited – a “BACN-mesh” concept could be employed to create real-time battlespace pictures, proving useful when a near-peer adversary attempts localized jamming across the EMS. A "BACN-mesh" concept, if properly employed with numerous smart node equipped aircraft, would "create a complex, impregnable, and mutually reinforcing communication network with multiple relay nodes."

== See also ==
- Global Information Grid
- Airborne radio relay
