= Massachusetts House of Representatives' 14th Norfolk district =

American legislative district

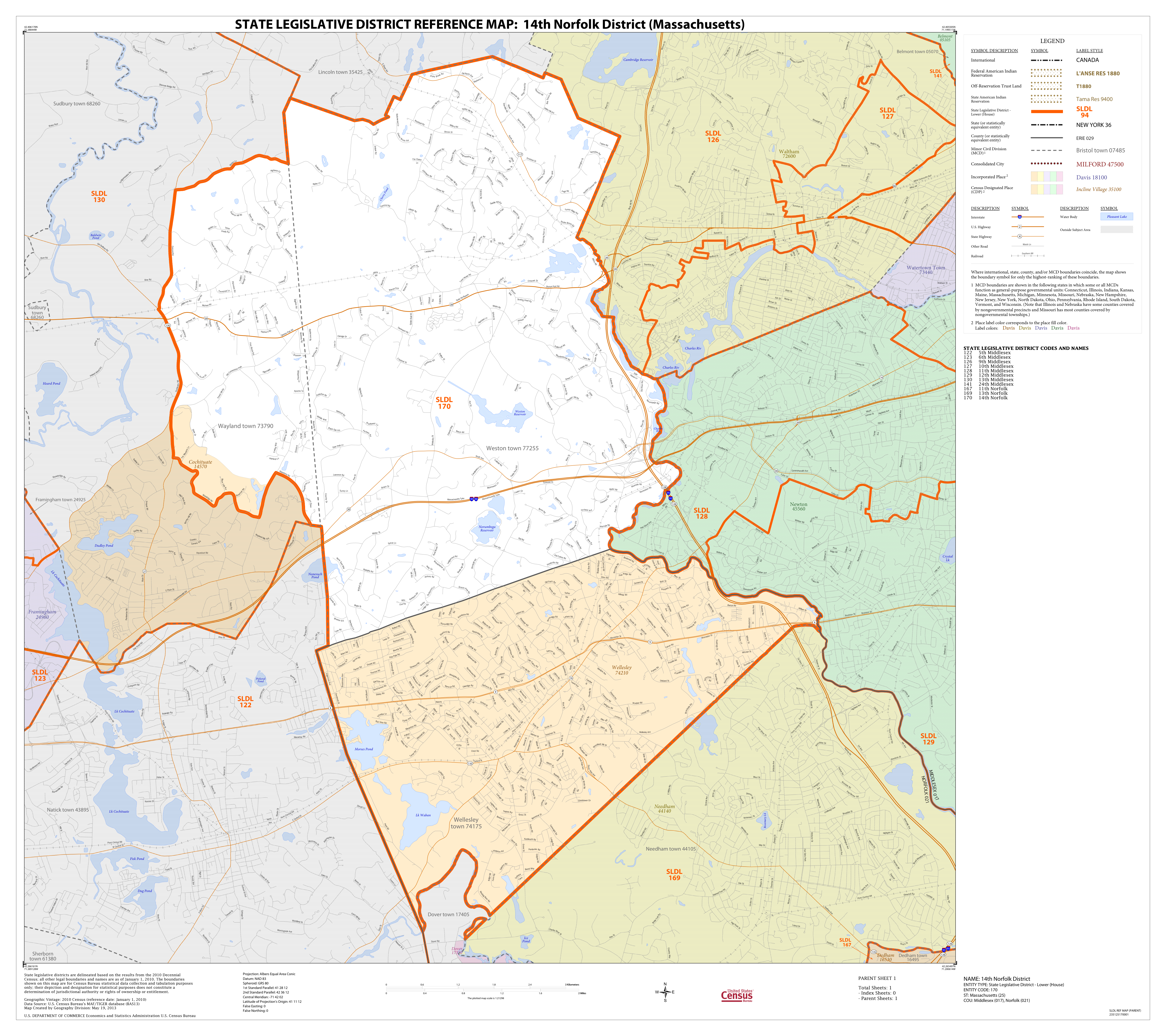
Map of Massachusetts House of Representatives' 14th Norfolk district, based on the 2010 United States census.

Massachusetts House of Representatives' 14th Norfolk district in the United States is one of 160 legislative districts included in the lower house of the Massachusetts General Court. It covers parts of Middlesex County and Norfolk County. Democrat Alice Peisch of Wellesley has represented the district since 2003.

== Towns represented ==
The district includes the following localities:

- Precinct 2 in Lincoln
- Wellesley
- Weston

The current district geographic boundary overlaps with those of the Massachusetts Senate's 1st Middlesex and Norfolk district, and 3rd Middlesex district.

=== Former locales ===
The district previously covered:

- Wayland, until 2022
- Dover, circa 1872
- Medfield, circa 1872
- Needham, circa 1872

== Representatives ==
- Lauren Kingsbury, circa 1858
- Henry Horton, circa 1859
- Gilbert W. Cox, Jr., circa 1975
- Royall H. Switzler, 1979–1986
- Robert H. Marsh, 1987–1992
- Peter E. Madden, 1993–1995
- John A. Locke, 1995–2003
- Alice Hanlon Peisch, 2003-current

== See also ==
- List of Massachusetts House of Representatives elections
- Other Norfolk County districts of the Massachusetts House of Representatives: 1st, 2nd, 3rd, 4th, 5th, 6th, 7th, 8th, 9th, 10th, 11th, 12th, 13th, 15th
- List of Massachusetts General Courts
- List of former districts of the Massachusetts House of Representatives

== Images ==
Portraits of legislators

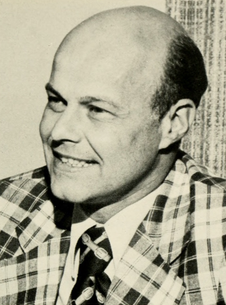
Gilbert Cox

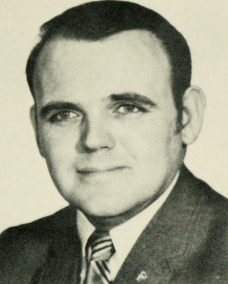
Royall Switzler

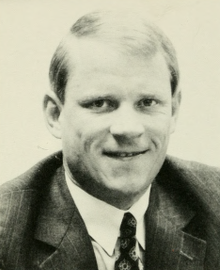
John Locke

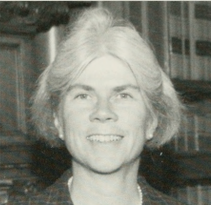
Alice Peisch
