= Alice Peisch =

American attorney and politician

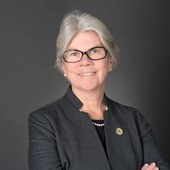

Member of the Massachusetts House of Representatives from the 14th Norfolk District
- Incumbent
- Assumed office 2003
- Preceded by: John A. Locke

Personal details
- Born: October 4, 1954 (age 72) Boston, Massachusetts, US
- Party: Democratic
- Education: Smith College, A.B., 1976; Suffolk University Law School, J.D., 1979; Kennedy School of Government, MPA, 2009
- Occupation: Attorney

Alice Hanlon Peisch (born October 4, 1954) is an American attorney and politician who has represented the 14th Norfolk District in the Massachusetts House of Representatives since 2003. She previously served as the Chair of the Joint Committee on Education from 2011 to 2023. She is currently serving on the House Committee on Ethics and the House Committee on Rules.

Prior to being elected to the House, Peisch served as Wellesley, Massachusetts Town Clerk from 2000 to 2003, was a member of Wellesley's School Committee from 1992 to 1999, and was a member of the Wellesley Advisory (Finance) Committee from 1989 to 1992.

== See also ==
- 2019–2020 Massachusetts legislature
- 2021–2022 Massachusetts legislature
