= Whitecliffe College of Arts and Design =

Private art school in Auckland, New Zealand

Coordinates: 36.8499°S 174.7843°E

Whitecliffe College
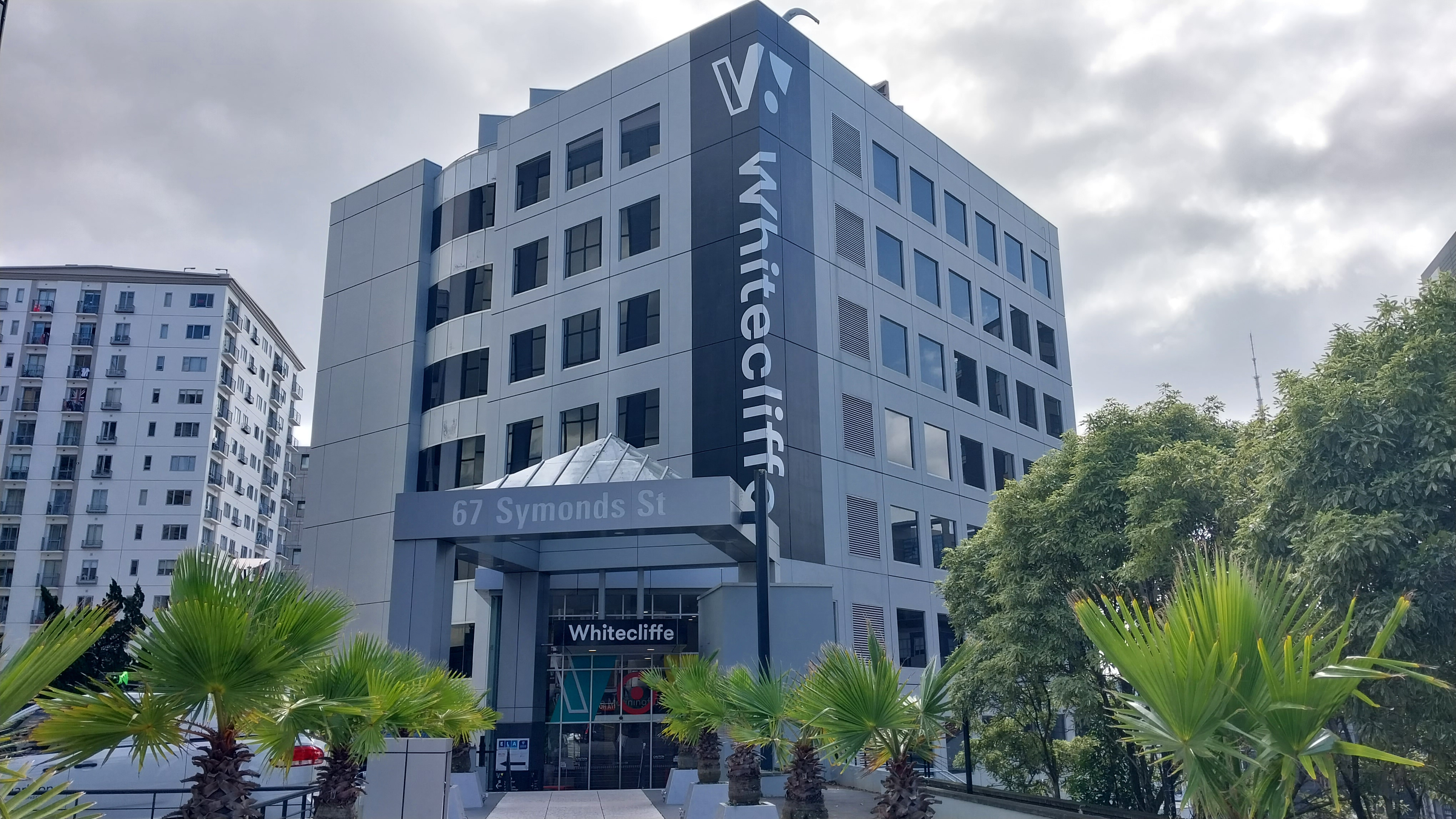
- Symonds Street, Auckland; New Zealand

Information
- Other name: Te Whare Takiura o Wikiriwhi
- Established: 1983
- Faculty: 70
- Enrolment: 850
- Website: https://www.whitecliffe.ac.nz/

Whitecliffe College is a private training establishment in New Zealand.

Whitecliffe College was established as a fine arts, design and fashion school in Auckland by artist Greg Whitecliffe and Michele Whitecliffe in 1983.

New Zealand educator Feroz Ali acquired Whitecliffe, NZ Fashion Tech, New Zealand School of Art & Fashion, and Computer Power Plus in 2018, and merged these institutions in 2019.

Whitecliffe College currently offers programmes across Fine Arts, Design Innovation, Fashion + Sustainability, Jewellery, Information Technology and Creative Arts Therapies.

Whitecliffe College has six campuses across New Zealand, including four in Auckland. The main campus is located on Symonds Street, the education hub of Auckland City. The other Auckland campuses are in Manukau City, Epsom and New Lynn. There are also campuses in Christchurch and Wellington.

== Notable alumni ==
- Freda Brierley (1993), textile artist
- Lina Marsh, mixed media artist
- Maggie Hewitt (2016), fashion designer
- Hiria Anderson (2016), NZ artist
- Benjamin Alexander (2017), fashion designer, winner of Project Runway New Zealand (season 1)
