= Tony Marsh =

Tony Marsh may refer to:

- Tony Marsh (racing driver) (1931–2009), English racing driver
- Tony Marsh (rugby union) (born 1972), New Zealand-born French rugby union player
- Tony Marsh (artist) (born 1954), American ceramic artist

== See also ==
- Toni Marsh (born 1968), New Zealand weather presenter
