= Jack Marsh (footballer, born 1947) =

English footballer

Personal information
- Full name: John William Marsh
- Date of birth: 17 December 1947 (age 78)
- Place of birth: Leeds, England
- Position: Goalkeeper

Senior career*
Years	Team	Apps	(Gls)
- New Farnley
1966–1967	Bradford City	12	(0)
- * Club domestic league appearances and goals

John William Marsh (born 17 December 1947) is an English former professional footballer who played as a goalkeeper.

== Career ==
Born in Leeds, Marsh joined Bradford City in June 1966 from New Farnley. He made 12 league appearances for the club. He was released by the club in 1967.

== Sources ==
- Frost, Terry (1988). Bradford City A Complete Record 1903-1988. Breedon Books Sport. ISBN 0-907969-38-0.
