= George T. Marsh =

Canadian politician

George T. Marsh was a Canadian politician. An employee of the Land Corporation of Canada, he was mayor of Regina, Saskatchewan in 1895 and a member of the town council from 1891 to 1893. Marsh was a member of the Legislative Assembly of the Northwest Territories.
