= Electronic Systems Center =

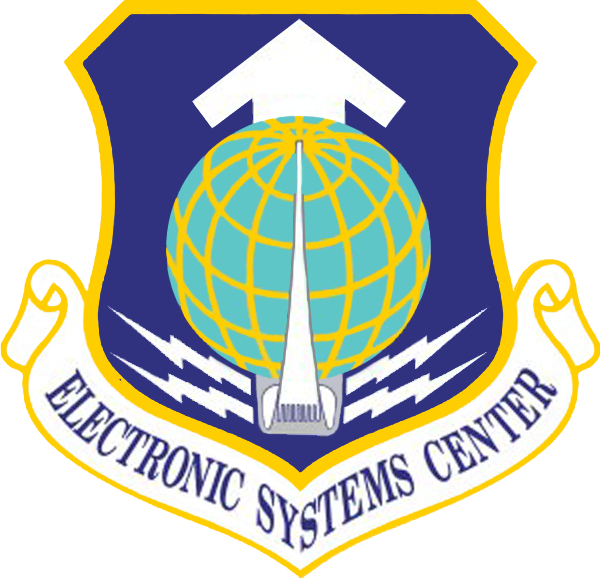
- Electronic Systems Center emblem
- Active: 1961-16 July 2012
- Country: United States
- Branch: United States Air Force
- Part of: Air Force Materiel Command
- Garrison/HQ: Hanscom Air Force Base

The Electronic Systems Center was a product center of Air Force Materiel Command (AFMC) headquartered at Hanscom Air Force Base, Massachusetts. Its mission was to develop and acquire command and control, communications, computer, and intelligence systems. ESC consisted of professional teams specializing in engineering, computer science, and business management. The teams supervised the design, development, testing, production, and deployment of command and control systems. Two of ESC's most well-known developments were the Boeing E-3 Sentry Airborne Warning and Control System (AWACS), developed in the 1970s, and the Joint Surveillance Target Attack Radar System (Joint STARS), developed in the 1980s.

The Electronic Systems Center served into five decades as the Air Force's organization for developing and acquiring Command and Control (C2) systems. As of December 2004, ESC managed approximately two hundred programs ranging from secure communications systems to mission planning systems. ESC had an annual budget of over $3 billion and more than eighty-seven hundred personnel. In addition to the Air Force, ESC works with other branches of the United States Department of Defense, the North American Aerospace Defense Command (NORAD), the National Aeronautics and Space Administration (NASA), the Federal Aviation Administration (FAA), the North Atlantic Treaty Organization (NATO), and foreign governments.

Due to AFMC restructuring, ESC was inactivated on 1 October 2012.

== History ==
The Air Force Command and Control Development Division was a component of Air Research and Development Command (ARDC) during the 1950s. On 1 April 1960 the 3245th Operations Group was activated to provide support to the "technical mission elements of the ADCCDD (ARDC) and other agencies as directed." In the first half of 1961, AFCCDD was reorganized as the Electronic Systems Division. At the same time, ARDC was reorganized and redesignated Air Force Systems Command. The Electronic Systems Division (ESD) was established on 1 April 1961 at Laurence G. Hanscom Field in Bedford, MA.

The Electronic Systems Division emerged after a decade of effort to meet the threat of long-range, nuclear-armed Soviet bombers. At Hanscom Field, the Massachusetts Institute of Technology’s new Lincoln Laboratory (1951) and later the MITRE Corporation (1958) had worked to bring the Semi Automatic Ground Environment (SAGE) air defense system to completion. The pioneering integrated radar and computer technology that was developed for SAGE also contributed significantly to the development of air traffic control systems.

ESD had an original portfolio of thirteen Command, control, and communications (C3) systems. The appearance of ballistic missiles to carry nuclear warheads spurred a second wave of defense efforts—the construction of the Ballistic Missile Early Warning System (BMEWS) and a survivable new command center for the North American Air Defense Command in the underground Cheyenne Mountain Complex in Colorado. New weapons systems and space platforms led to enlarged ESD C3 programs.

ESD’s first radar systems were ground-based, but in the 1960s, the organization expanded into airborne radar systems. In overcoming the “ground clutter” problem, the 1970s Airborne Warning and Control System (AWACS) represented a technological achievement for airspace surveillance. It was joined in the later 1980s by the Joint Surveillance Target Attack Radar System (Joint STARS). While still under development, Joint STARS was pressed into service for the Gulf War to monitor movement on the battlefield. Other ESD programs focused on creating secure communications systems, air defense systems for allied nations, command centers, intelligence data transmission, air traffic control systems, and computer-based training systems.

In 1992, the Air Force Systems Command and the Air Force Logistics Command were merged to form the Air Force Materiel Command (AFMC). ESD was re-designated the Electronic Systems Center (ESC), and the organization was placed under the new AFMC. Two years later, ESC was enlarged to become the AFMC Center of Excellence for Command and Control, with headquarters at Hanscom. Several geographically separated units were added to the center. At one time, the 66th Air Base Wing, 350th Electronic Systems Wing, 551st Electronic Systems Wing, 554th Electronic Systems Wing, and 653d Electronic Systems Wing all reported to the ESC Commander.

Since the later years of the Cold War, ESC worked to upgrade its key radar, command center, and communications systems. The decade of the 1990s presented new challenges for the expanded Center in the form of regional conflicts, joint and coalition engagements, terrorism, and asymmetric warfare. In response, ESC developed programs to work towards integration and interoperability in C2 systems. By presenting systems in action via several interactive C2 demonstrations, ESC engaged in ongoing dialogue with its customers. The Center then undertook a major restructure of its acquisition processes starting in 1996. “Spiral development” was introduced to achieve state-of-the-art systems in a timely, flexible, and cost-effective approach.

The pace of these initiatives had gained momentum by the start of the 21st century. The ESC developed automated systems for Air Tasking Orders, weather, mission planning, and management information, together with enhanced force protection for Air Force personnel on the ground. For the series of Joint Expeditionary Force Experiments (JEFX) starting in 1998, ESC managed the insertion of new C2 and information technology. At the same time, its work on standardizing C2 infrastructure and creating architectures laid the groundwork for further system integration.

In 2001, the Air Force gave ESC the lead responsibility to integrate its command and control, intelligence, surveillance, and reconnaissance systems—the C2 Enterprise Integration. Integrated C2ISR capabilities will enable the development of network-centric warfare and provide an asymmetric force advantage. The ESC pursued a major initiative to standardize and upgrade C2ISR capabilities at Air Operations Centers, with the goal of realizing the Aerospace Operations Center of the future.

Due to a major AFMC restructuring announced on 2 November 2011, ESC was to be inactivated no later than 1 October 2012. The role of ESC, along with the Aeronautical Systems Center (ASC) and the Air Armament Center (AAC), will be consolidated into the new Air Force Life Cycle Management Center (LCMC). This, along with other measures, will save up to $109 million for the Air Force annually. The new LCMC will be headquartered at Wright-Patterson AFB. The highest-ranking officer at Hanscom AFB after the reorganization will be a major general, who will be the Program Executive Officer for the C3I and Networks AFPEO. The main purpose of the reorganization is to eliminate excess headquarter and staff type positions throughout AFMC.

The ESC deactivation ceremony took place on 16 July 2012 and from that point forward Hanscom AFB was part of the AFLCMC.

=== Fort Franklin ===
Fort Franklin (42.4729°N 71.3033°W) was an on-base encampment in the 1990s used for the purpose of testing new technology. The ESC had developed many of the radars and sensors used by military aircraft, and had created many of the command and control systems. However, when these systems were deployed for Operation Desert Storm, many did not work as advertised or communicate information to one another. In October 1993, Lieutenant General Charles E. Franklin took over as Commander of the ESC. ESC was the home of most of the new command and control technologies being sent to the war, but was getting a bad reputation for the lack of quality in the systems sent to the war. He decided to hold a technical exercise to emulate a deployed headquarters using the equipment ESC was producing, and test the reports.

The technical exercise went live in July 1994. The encampment used a patch of grass near the end of the runway. Using tents, trailers, and communication vans inside a guarded perimeter, the area was quickly dubbed “Fort Franklin.” It was staffed by engineers from every program office and a few junior military. Major Steve Zenishek, with recent Gulf War experience, became the installation “commander” and was able to show off that the great capability indeed worked fine alone, but unfortunately didn't work well with others.

Rather than take the failure as a defeat, General Franklin used it to encourage the staff to rebuild the systems under development to interoperate. Subsequently, by the time the second Fort Franklin occurred on 1–16 May 1995, the systems were beginning to communicate. For the first time, the results of calculations performed by one system were transferred automatically to another system for further interpretation or processing.

Not wanting to lose the expertise that had created this success, LtGen Franklin established an ongoing experimentation facility at Hanscom known as the Command & Control (C2) Unified Development Environment (CUBE). CUBE was later renamed the C2 Engineering and Integration Facility (CEIF).

The experience of Fort Franklin was instrumental in development in 1997 of the Air Force's major experiment, the Expeditionary Force Experiment (EFX 98), which became a Joint EFX (JEFX) in 1999.

== Lineage ==
- Constituted as the Electronic Systems Division on 20 March 1961

Activated on 1 Apr 61
Redesignated Electronic Systems Center on 1 July 92
Inactivated on 1 October 2012

=== Assignments ===
- Air Force Systems Command, 1 April 1961
- Air Force Materiel Command, 1 July 1992 – 1 October 2012 (attached to Air Force Life Cycle Management Center after 16 July 2012)

=== Components ===
- 38th Engineering Installation Wing, c1994
- 66th Air Base Wing
- 350th Electronic Systems Wing, 17 December 2004 – 30 June 2010
- 551st Electronic Systems Wing
- 554th Electronic Systems Wing
- 653d Electronic Systems Wing
- other wings, groups, squadrons, and directorates

=== Stations ===
- Hanscom Air Force Base, 1 April 1961 - 1 October 2012

=== Commanders ===
Officer	Tenure
Maj Gen Kenneth P. Bergquist	1 April 1961 - 16 February 1962
Brig/Major General|Maj Gen Charles H. Terhune, Jr	16 February 1962 - 15 July 1964
Maj Gen John W. O'Neill	15 July 1964 - 1 July 1967
Maj Gen John B. Bestic	1 July 1967 - 31 July 1968
Maj Gen Joseph J. Cody, Jr	1 August 1968 - 29 October 1971
Maj Gen Albert R. Sheily, Jr	29 October 1971 - 29 March 1974
Maj Gen Benjamin N. Bellis	29 March 1974 - 11 October 1974
Maj Gen/Lt Gen Wilbur L. Creech	11 October 1974 - 2 May 1977
Lt Gen Robert T. Marsh	2 May 1977 - 28 January 1981
Maj/Lt Gen James W. Stansberry	28 January 1981 - 25 July 1984
Lt Gen Melvin F. Chubb, Jr	25 July 1984 - 30 September 1988
Lt Gen Gordon E. Fornell	30 September 1988 - 29 October 1993
Lt Gen Charles E. Franklin	29 October 1993 - 16 August 1996
Lt Gen Ronald T. Kadish	16 August 1996 – 10 June 1999
Lt Gen Leslie F. Kenne	10 June 1999 – 17 April 2002
Brig Gen Robert H. Latiff (Interim Commander)	17 April 2002 - 28 May 2002
Lt Gen William R. Looney III	28 May 2002 - 8 December 2003
Lt Gen Charles L. Johnson II	8 December 2003 – November 2007
Lt Gen Ted F. Bowlds	November 2007 - 1 September 2011
Lt Gen Charles R. Davis	1 September 2011 – May 2012
Col Mark S. Spillman	1 May 2012 – 16 July 2012

== See also ==
- List of military installations in Massachusetts
