= John Marsh (footballer, born 1842) =

English cricketer and footballer (1842–1880)

John Marsh (1842 – 21 April 1880) was an English cricket player and footballer, who played as a defender. A key figure of association football in the Sheffield of the 1860s and 1870s, he was regarded as one of the best players in his position.

== Early life ==
Born in Thurlstone, a small village in the county of South Yorkshire, England, he was the son of Thomas, a stone mason, and Elizabeth.

He was baptized in the nearby town of Penistone by Samuel Sunderland, headmaster of Penistone Grammar School – the same school where Marsh later studied.

== Playing career ==
According to John Ness Dransfield, he was the second persone to ever captain Sheffield F.C.. It is possible that he subsequently played for other clubs located in Sheffield.

In 1867, he signed for Mackenzie, appearing in the world's first-ever football tournament, the Youdan Cup.

Shortly afterwards, he transferred to The Wednesday, where he played in and won the second-ever football competition, the Cromwell Cup, in 1868.
