= Terry Marsh =

Terry Marsh may refer to:

- Terence Marsh (1931–2018), British production designer
- Terry Marsh (boxer) (born 1958), English boxer, from Basildon
