= John Marsh (14th-century MP) =

English politician

John Marsh (fl. 1394–1397) of Bath, Somerset, was an English politician.

He was a Member (MP) of the Parliament of England for Bath in 1394, 1395 and January 1397. He married a woman named Edith and they had one daughter.
