= Radio relay =

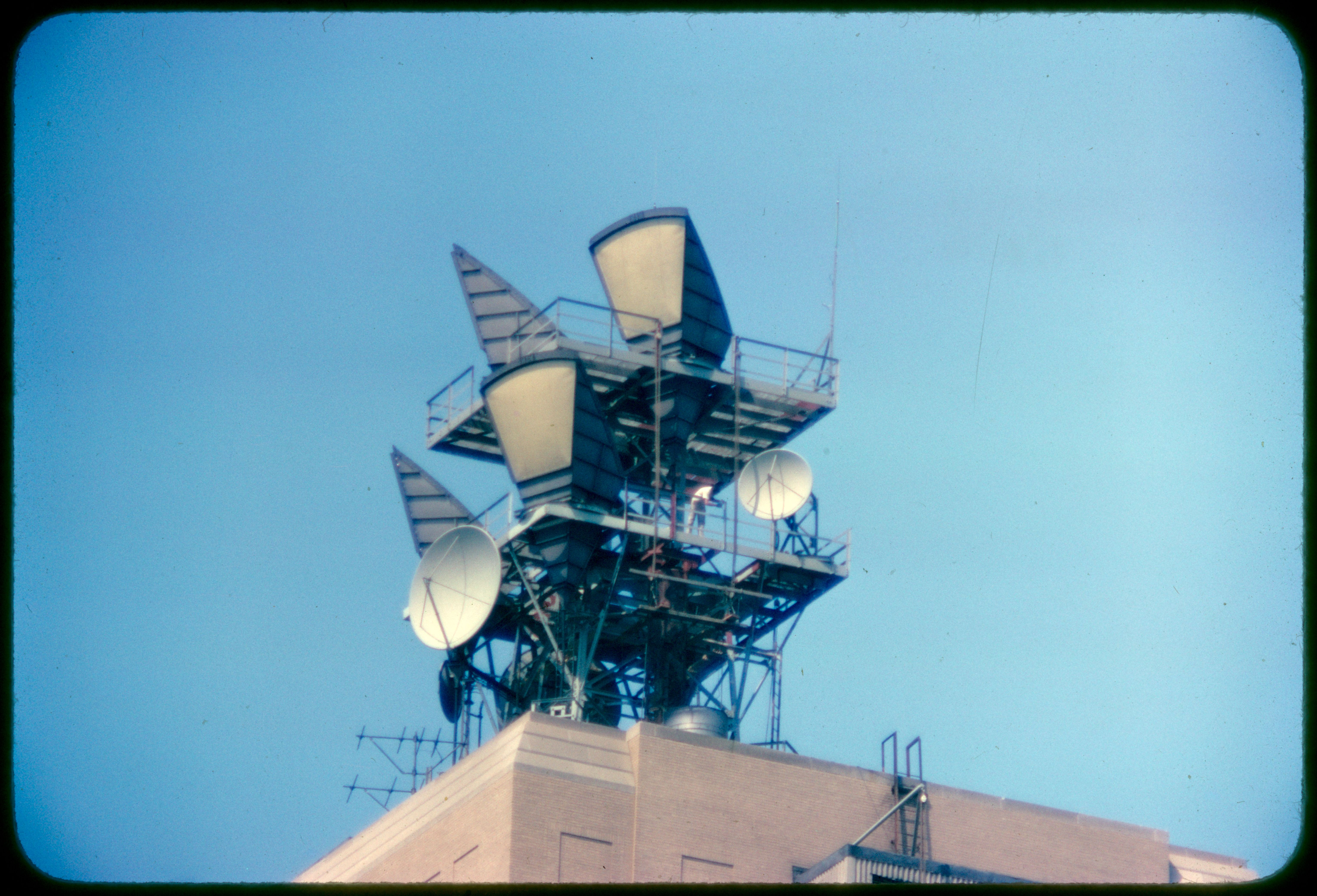
Multiple antennas of a microwave radio relay tower in Massachusetts

Radio stations that cannot communicate directly due to distance, terrain or other difficulties sometimes use an intermediate radio relay station to relay the signals. A radio relay receives weak signals and retransmits them, often in a different direction, as a stronger signal. Examples include airborne radio relay, microwave radio relay, and communications satellite. The American Radio Relay League was founded for this purpose but did not change its name when this became a less important part of its work.

== See also ==
- Repeater
- Transponder
- Broadcast relay station
- List of auxiliaries of the United States Navy § Major communications relay ships (AGMR)
