= Kenneth P. Bergquist (United States Air Force) =

United States Air Force general (1912–1993)

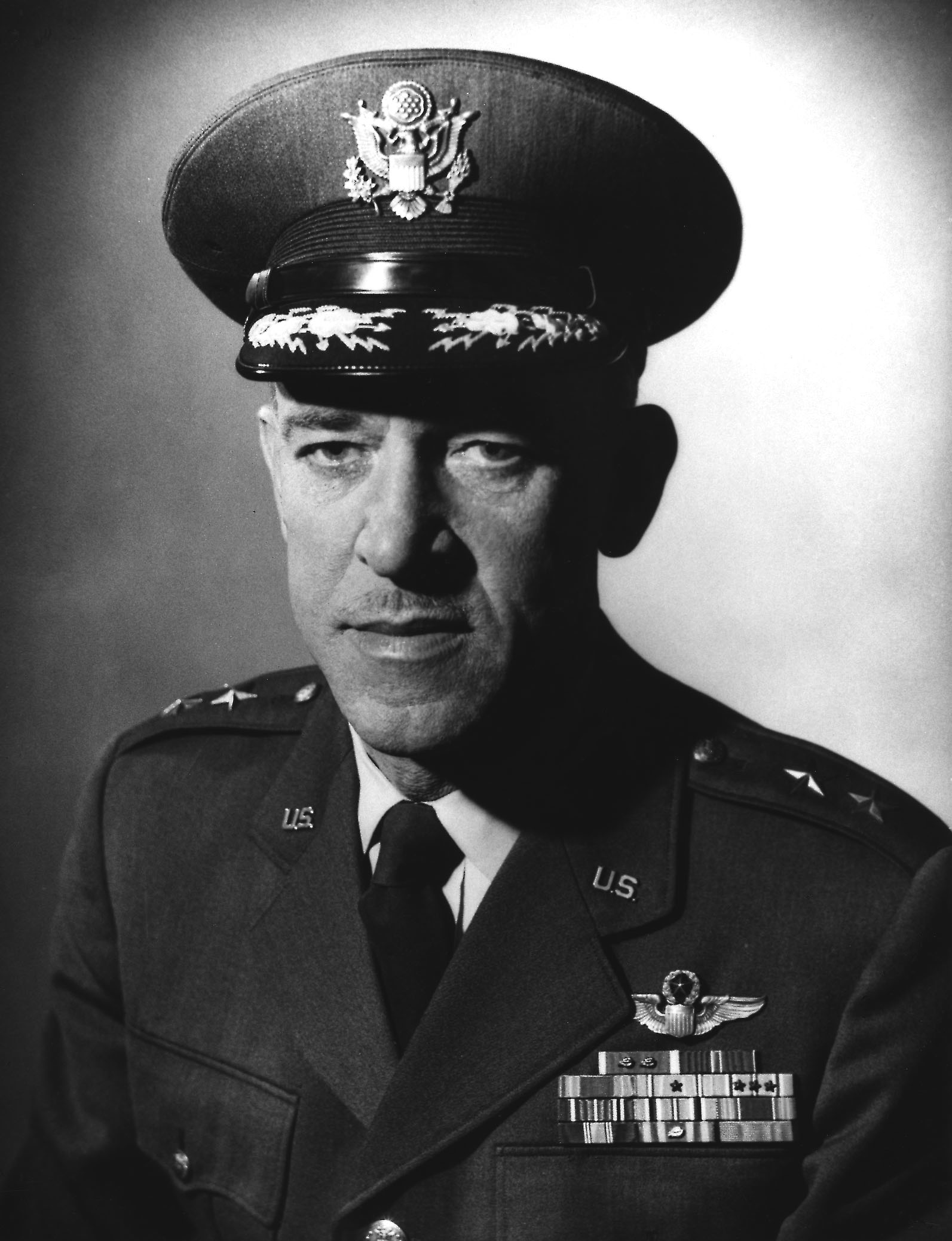
Major General Kenneth P. Bergquist

Kenneth Paul Bergquist Sr. (November 21, 1912 – August 4, 1993) was an officer of the United States Air Force, and its predecessor, the United States Army Air Forces, who ultimately attained the rank of major general.

== Biography ==
Bergquist was born in Crookston, Minnesota, in 1912. His family moved to Grand Forks, North Dakota, in 1928, and he graduated from Central High School. He attended the University of North Dakota for a year, before enrolling in the United States Military Academy in 1931.

Upon his graduation in 1935, he was commissioned as a second lieutenant in the United States Army. Bergquist began flight training at Randolph Air Force Base in 1935, and completed flight training at Kelly Air Force Base, receiving his pilot's wings in October 1936.

Bergquist's first posting was to Langley Air Force Base. In December 1937, he became assistant operations officer of the 8th Pursuit Group at Langley. He next became assistant operations officer of the 2nd Wing at General Headquarters Air Force, also at Langley.

After a promotion to first lieutenant, Bergquist was posted to the 18th Pursuit Group at Wheeler Army Airfield in mid-1939. He was promoted to become the 18th Pursuit Group's operations and intelligence officer in June 1940. A year later, he became a colonel and operations officer of the 14th Pursuit Wing (soon to be renamed the Hawaiian Interceptor Command). The Hawaiian Interceptor Command suffered heavy casualties during the December 7, 1941 Attack on Pearl Harbor by the Empire of Japan. Shortly after the U.S. entered World War II, the Hawaiian Fighter Command was redesignated the VII Fighter Command, and Bergquist remained its operations officer.

In June 1942, Bergquist traveled to New Caledonia to oversee air defense for the United States Armed Forces on that island. Following the creation of the United States Army Air Forces in June 1942, Bergquist was assigned to the General Headquarters Air Force in Washington, D. C. in July 1942. There, he served in the operations section. In 1944, he was posted to the 73d Air Division in the Pacific Theater, seeing duty during the Battle of Saipan. He then served as operations officer of the VII Fighter Command during the Battle of Iwo Jima.

Bergquist returned to Army Air Force Headquarters in Washington in September 1945, becoming deputy to the assistant chief of staff for operations.

In July 1947, in the midst of the Greek Civil War, Bergquist was posted to Athens as a military air attaché. He returned to the United States in August 1949.

Bergquist then spent a year at the National War College, and then in 1950, joined the headquarters of the Continental Air Command at Mitchel Air Force Base. During his time in Greece, the United States Army Air Forces had been superseded by the United States Air Force (USAF), and Bergquist was now a member of the USAF. When the Air Defense Command was reestablished in January 1951, Bergquist became director of plans and requirements at its headquarters in Colorado Springs, Colorado. In this capacity, he was responsible for planning the U.S.'s air defense system. From September 1951 until June 1955, he was deputy chief of staff for operations of the Air Defense Command. He then returned to Air Force headquarters in Washington, D. C., serving as director of operations for two years, and then as assistant deputy chief of staff for operations.

In June 1958, Bergquist was assigned to Hanscom Air Force Base as deputy commander (Air Research and Development Command). There, he was responsible for defense systems integration. In 1960, he became Commander of the Command and Control Development Division. When the Air Force Systems Command and the Air Force Logistics Command were established in April 1961, the organizations at Hanscom were consolidated and renamed the Electronic Systems Center, with Bergquist as the ESC's first commander.

Bergquist became head of the Air Force Communications Service in February 1962.

He retired on July 1, 1965.

Bergquist died on August 4, 1993, in Riverside, California. He was interred at the West Point Cemetery with his wife Alice Starke (Porterfield) Bergquist (January 19, 1917 – October 20, 1994).
