= Paul Marsh (South African cricketer) =

South African cricketer (born 1939)

Personal information
- Full name: Paul Marsh
- Born: 5 December 1939 (age 86); Johannesburg, Transvaal, South Africa
- Batting: Right-handed
- Bowling: Right-arm off break

Domestic team information
- Years: Team
- 1965: Cambridge University
- 1965: Cambridgeshire

Career statistics
Competition	First-class
Matches	1
Runs scored	25
Batting average	12.50
100s/50s	–/–
Top score	23
Balls bowled	42
Wickets	0
Bowling average	–
5 wickets in innings	–
10 wickets in match	–
Best bowling	–
Catches/stumpings	1/–
- Source: Cricinfo, 21 July 2019

Paul Marsh (born 5 December 1939) is a South African former first-class cricketer.

Marsh was born at Johannesburg. He studied in England at the University of Cambridge, attending Jesus College. While studying at Cambridge, Marsh made a single appearance in first-class cricket for Cambridge University against Middlesex at Fenner's in 1965. Batting twice in the match, he was dismissed for 2 runs in the Cambridge first-innings by Don Bennett, while in their second-innings he was dismissed for 23 runs by Fred Titmus. He also bowled seven wicketless overs with his right-arm off break bowling across the match. In addition to playing first-class cricket, Marsh also played minor counties cricket for Cambridgeshire in 1965, making five appearances in the Minor Counties Championship.
