= Edward Marsh (cricketer) =

English cricketer

Edward Caldecot Marsh (7 May 1865 – 27 November 1926) was an English cricketer who played first-class cricket for Somerset in 1885. He was born at Belgaum, Karnataka, India and died at Kendal, Westmorland (now Cumbria).

== Cricket career ==
Educated at Malvern College and at Merton College, Oxford University, Marsh was a lower-order right-handed batsman in two first-class games in the 1885 season, achieving little and making a highest score of just 15 in the first of them, against Gloucestershire. He played for Somerset in a non-first-class match after the county club lost first-class status in 1886, and then played for several years in non-first-class cricket for Devon. He did not play any first-class cricket while at Oxford.

== Outside cricket ==
Marsh graduated from Oxford with a Bachelor of Arts degree in 1887. In his death notice in The Times in 1926, he is identified as "of Burstow School, Surrey" and as the son of "the late Colonel Marsh and of Mrs Marsh, of Bath". His wife was called Fanny and their only child, a son, Neville, was killed in 1916 in the First World War aged 18.
