= John Marsh (footballer, born 1940) =

English footballer

Personal information
- Full name: John Stanley Marsh
- Date of birth: 31 August 1940 (age 86)
- Place of birth: Farnworth, England
- Position: Inside forward

Youth career
- Little Hulton
- 1957–1959: Oldham Athletic

Senior career*
Years	Team	Apps	(Gls)
1959–1960	Oldham Athletic	2	(0)
- Witton Albion
- * Club domestic league appearances and goals

John Stanley Marsh (born 31 August 1940) is an English former professional footballer who played as an inside forward.

== Career ==
Born in Farnworth, Marsh played for Little Hulton, Oldham Athletic and Witton Albion.
