= Tom Marsh =

Tom Marsh may refer to:

- Tom Marsh (baseball) (born 1965), Major League Baseball player
- Tom Marsh (politician) (born 1939), member of the Oregon House of Representatives
- Tom Marsh (astronomer) (1961–2022), British astronomer and astrophysicist
- Tom Marsh, member of the UK band Trash Fashion

== See also ==
- Thomas B. Marsh (1800–1866), early leader in the Latter Day Saint movement
