= George Marsh (Australian footballer) =

Australian rules footballer

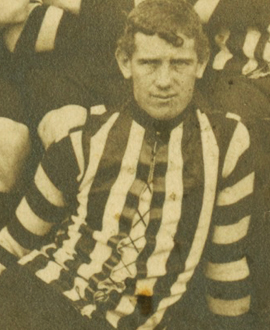
- Marsh in 1905

Personal information
- Full name: Mungo George Marsh
- Born: 31 December 1884; Bendigo, Victoria
- Died: 9 October 1940 (aged 55); Brunswick, Victoria
- Original team: Coburg
- Height: 173 cm (5 ft 8 in)
- Weight: 73 kg (161 lb)

Playing career^{1}
Years	Club	Games (Goals)
1905	Collingwood	7 (3)
- ^{1} Playing statistics correct to the end of 1905.

Mungo George Marsh (31 December 1884 – 9 October 1940) was an Australian rules footballer who played with Collingwood in the Victorian Football League (VFL).
