= Lina Marsh =

New Zealand artist, educator and curator

- Born: 1972 or 1973 (age 53–54)
- Education: Whitecliffe College of Arts and Design
- Known for: Mixed-media artworks
- Children: 5

Lina Marsh (born 1972/73) is a mixed-media artist, arts educator and curator based in Gisborne, New Zealand. Her works often feature elements of handicrafts such as weaving and embroidery, and explore issues of identity as a Niuean-Māori woman and incorporate her personal experiences.

== Early life and education ==
Marsh grew up in Auckland and Hokianga and is of Niuean and Māori descent. Her mother migrated from Niue to Auckland as a young child in the 1950s. Her father was Māori and from Horeke, Hokianga, where Marsh spent most of her early childhood. Her parents met at Western Springs College and were members of the Polynesian Panthers, a political movement advocating against racial injustice. Marsh attended Mt Roskill Grammar School where she excelled at art.

Marsh's art has been inspired by her mother and grandmother, who imparted sewing skills that became foundational to her later works. At the age of 8, Marsh joined her local knitting club, and went on to develop her crafting skills under the guidance of her mother, grandmother, and other women in the community. Marsh has said she sees stitching as a form of ritual connecting her to her matriarchal line and femininity.

Her Niuean heritage, commemorated through handicrafts, embroidery, crochet, and stitching, became a significant influence. Marsh went on to study at Whitecliffe College of Arts and Design, where she exhibited and won several awards for her work. She graduated from Whitecliffe with a Bachelor of Fine Arts, majoring in painting, and later completed a diploma in secondary teaching.

== Career ==
=== Artwork ===
At Whitecliffe College of Arts and Design, Marsh incorporated her personal experiences as a Pasifika-Māori woman into her paintings and addressed issues such as feminism, colonisation, assimilation, migration and contemporary Pacific cultures. She has continued to explore these themes in her post-graduation career, including through mixed media artworks and the use of print-making, collage, sculpture, crochet, embroidery and knitting. Through the Pacific Studies teacher at Whitecliffe she began working with Tautai Pacific Arts Trust.

Marsh participated in the worldwide exhibition CowParade in 2002 creating a woven cow using 600 harakeke. After moving to Gisborne in 2005, she exhibited her work as part of the National Women's Art Exhibition held there in 2006 and received an award. The following year she won the sculpture category in the same exhibition for her work Tahi, Tahi, One, which involved the creation of hiapo (traditional Niuean cloth) ponchos. In Rarotonga in 2007 she exhibited work for the show Longitude, which also travelled to Switzerland in 2011. Tahi, Tahi, One was exhibited as part of the Kau Auloa exhibition at the first Niue Arts and Culture Taoga Festival in 2009. A decade later in 2019 Marsh returned to the island to paint a mural for the same annual festival.

She has painted a number of notable murals in Gisborne, including artworks for the Gisborne District Council and for Makaraka School. In 2018 she painted a mural for Gisborne's public library. In 2017 she participated in the exhibition Te Ha which commemorated James Cook's first encounter with Māori at Te Tairawhiti. Her works, displayed in Gisborne shops, were miniature sculptures that often commented on societal issues affecting Māori and Pasifika communities.

In 2021 Marsh curated and participated in the exhibition Colonies held at Tairawhiti Museum. Sustainability was a key theme of the exhibition with all artwork using recycled material. Her work for this exhibition included Coral Reef Couch, a crochet collaboration between herself and her mother inspired by coral reefs. She also held workshops during the exhibition during which participants created coral-inspired art.

=== Curation ===
As an established artist, Marsh began curating exhibitions predominantly in Auckland and Gisborne, New Zealand. The first show she curated was Pick Me Up and Hold Me (2005) at Artstation, Auckland. In 2013 she curated To Be Pacific, the first large contemporary Pacific art exhibition in Gisborne at Tairāwhiti Museum.

Other shows curated by Marsh at Tairawhiti Museum include Scent (2008), Davy Jones's Locker (2010), Top Art Regional Folio Exhibition (2014), Taonga Tuku Iho (2016) and the 100 Day Project (2017). She was a board member of Tairawhiti Museum, and in 2017 became president of the Friends of the Museum Committee.

=== Arts education ===
Marsh has taught art at a secondary school level, including at Penrose High School. As of 2018 she taught product design as part of the technology curriculum at Gisborne Girls' High School. At Tairawhiti Museum she was an educator for the Ministry of Education's outside the classroom curriculum support project. She has also taught Fresh Horizons workshops, designed for senior high school students of Pacific Island heritage, at venues such as the Eastern Institute of Technology on behalf of the Tautai Contemporary Pacific Arts Trust.

== Personal life ==
Marsh has played the theremin and piano in an all-female punk band called Suki and the Disappointments since 2021. She is the mother of five children.

== Awards, scholarships and prizes ==
- 2006: Winner of the Mixed-Media Category at the National Women's Art Exhibition
- 2007: Winner of the Sculpture Category at the National Women's Art Exhibition
- 2007: Recipient of a Creative New Zealand Arts Grant
