= Jim Marsh (American football) =

American football coach

Coaching career (HC unless noted)
- 1990: West Virginia Tech

Head coaching record
- Overall: 3–7

Jim Marsh is an American football coach. He served as the head football coach at West Virginia University Institute of Technology in Montgomery, West Virginia for one season, in 1990 season, compiling a record of 3–7.
