= Michele Marsh =

Michele Marsh may refer to:

- Michele Marsh (reporter) (1954–2017), American news journalist and television anchor
- Michele Marsh (actress) (born 1946), American actress

== See also ==
- Michelle Marsh (born 1982), singer and former glamour model
