= Matthew Marsh =

Matthew Marsh may refer to:

- Matthew Marsh (racing driver) (born 1968), British racing driver
- Matthew Marsh (actor) (born 1954), English actor
- Matthew Marsh (boxer) (born 1982), British professional boxer
- Matthew Henry Marsh, British Member of Parliament for Salisbury and Queensland pioneer pastoralist
- Matty Marsh, English rugby league footballer
