= Richard Marsh =

Richard Marsh may refer to:

- Richard Marsh (bishop) (died 1226), Lord Chancellor of England and Bishop of Durham
- Richard Marsh (horseman) (1851–1933), British racehorse trainer
- Richard Marsh (author) (1857–1915), pseudonym of author Richard Heldman
- Richard Marsh, Baron Marsh (1928–2011), Labour cabinet minister and chairman of British Rail
- Richard Marsh (racing driver), British Touring Car Championship racer
- Richard Marsh (rugby league) (born 1962), rugby league footballer of the 1980s
- Richard Marsh (1937–2009), birth name of American musician Sky Saxon
- Richard Oglesby Marsh (1883-1953), an American engineer, explorer, diplomat, and ethnologist.
