= Robert Burkall Marsh =

Robert Burkall Marsh (born 1950) is a Welsh-born painter who moved to New Zealand as a child. His style has moved from photo-realist to expressionist.

Born in Cardiff, Wales in 1950, Marsh emigrated with his family to Auckland, New Zealand, where he was educated at Westlake Boys' High School. He then attended the Elam School of Fine Arts at the University of Auckland from 1967 to 1970, where he obtained a Diploma of Fine Arts. From 1975 to 1978 he studied at the Royal College of Art in London, gaining a MA in painting.

A prizewinner in the John Moores Liverpool Exhibition, Marsh has taught at Southwark College. His solo exhibitions, mainly in London and New Zealand, have included the Mertz Gallery and the Royal College of Pathologists.

Examples of his works are in collections including the National Theatre, the Granada Foundation, and the Royal College of Art.
