= Reginald Marsh (cricketer) =

English cricketer

Personal information
- Full name: Reginald Bert Marsh
- Born: 11 August 1897; Wells, Somerset, England
- Died: 25 April 1969 (aged 71); Bristol, England
- Batting: Right-handed
- Bowling: Right-arm medium pace

Domestic team information
- Years: Team
- 1928–1934: Somerset

Career statistics
Competition	FC
Matches	4
Runs scored	42
Batting average	10.50
100s/50s	0/0
Top score	24*
Balls bowled	372
Wickets	2
Bowling average	98.50
5 wickets in innings	0
10 wickets in match	0
Best bowling	2/121
Catches/stumpings	1/–
- Source: CricketArchive, 22 December 2015

Reginald Bert Marsh (11 August 1897 – 25 April 1969) played first-class cricket for Somerset in four matches, two in each of the 1928 and 1934 seasons. He was born at Wells, Somerset and died at Bristol.

Marsh was a right-handed lower-order batsman and a right-arm medium-pace bowler. His two matches in May 1928 were both drawn, with the second game against Derbyshire badly affected by rain. In 1934, he was used as an opening bowler and took the only two wickets of his first-class career in the game against Surrey, though at a high cost. In this match he also made his highest score, an unbeaten 24 as Somerset saved the match after a rearguard batting revival led by Arthur Wellard.

In 1941 he made a non-first-class appearance in a Services match between Somerset and Gloucestershire in which he was Gloucestershire Services' most successful bowler and batsman in a heavy defeat by Somerset Services.
