= Robert T. Marsh =

United States Air Force general

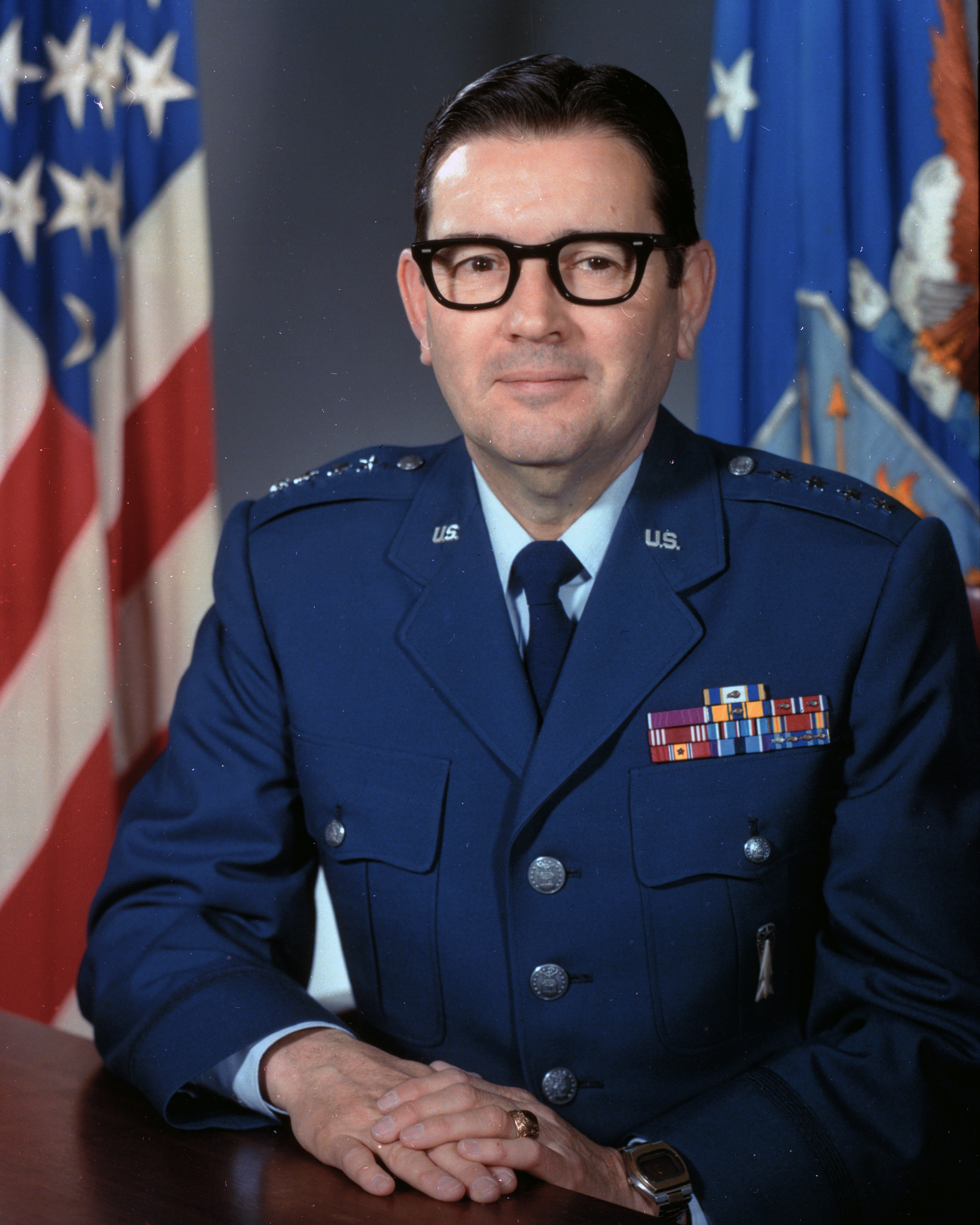
- Born: January 3, 1925; Logansport, Indiana
- Died: December 28, 2017 (aged 92); Potomac Falls, Virginia
- Alma mater: University of Michigan
- Military career
- Allegiance: United States of America
- Branch: United States Air Force
- Service years: 1943–1945 (enlisted); 1949–1984 (officer)
- Rank: general
- Commands: Air Force Systems Command
- Conflicts: World War II
- Awards: Air Force Distinguished Service Medal (2); Legion of Merit

Robert Thomas Marsh (January 3, 1925 – December 28, 2017) was a United States Air Force four-star general who served as Commander, Air Force Systems Command (COMAFSC) from 1981 to 1984.

== Military career ==
Born in 1925, in Logansport, Indiana, Marsh graduated from Logansport High School in 1942 and was attending Wabash College in Crawfordsville, Indiana, when he was inducted into the U.S. Army Air Forces in 1943. In July 1945 Marsh received a Regular Army appointment to the United States Military Academy. He graduated in 1949 with a Bachelor of Science degree in military arts and sciences, and a commission as a second lieutenant in the U.S. Air Force. He earned Master of Science degrees from the University of Michigan in instrumentation engineering and aeronautical engineering in 1956. He also completed Air Command and Staff College and the Air War College, both schools located at Maxwell Air Force Base, Alabama.

As an enlisted man in the Army Air Forces for almost two years, he completed both aircraft mechanic and aerial gunnery training on B-17s and B-24s prior to his appointment to the academy. Following his graduation he attended the Air Tactical School at Tyndall Air Force Base, Florida, and in December 1949 entered preliminary technical training at the Atomic Weapons and Radiological Safety School at Keesler Air Force Base, Mississippi. In July 1950 he joined the Armed Forces Special Weapons Project as an atomic weapons assembly officer at Sandia Base, New Mexico. Later, he was assigned to the cadre of the 5th Aviation Field Depot Squadron, an atomic weapon assembly and storage organization, and went with the squadron in 1951 to Sidi Slimane Air Base, Morocco. In December 1952 he transferred to Headquarters 7th Air Division, Strategic Air Command, South Ruislip, England, where he served as an armament and electronics staff officer.

From September 1954 to June 1956, Marsh attended the University of Michigan under the Air Force Institute of Technology program. In July 1956 he was assigned to Headquarters Air Research and Development Command with duty at Wright-Patterson Air Force Base, Ohio, where he served as project officer in the SM-64A Navaho and TM-61-76 Matador/Mace weapon systems project offices.

Following Air Command and Staff College in July 1960, Marsh was assigned to the Ballistic Missile Division, Air Force Systems Command, Los Angeles Air Force Station, California. He returned to Maxwell Air Force Base to attend the Air War College from August 1964 to June 1965.

He was assigned to Headquarters U.S. Air Force, Washington, D.C., in July 1965 in the Office of the Deputy Chief of Staff, Research and Development, as a staff officer in the Directorate of Reconnaissance and Electronic Warfare. He later became chief of the Projects Division in the Directorate of Space. He completed his tour of duty at the Pentagon as executive officer for the deputy chief of staff for research and development.

In September 1969 Marsh returned to Wright-Patterson Air Force Base as deputy for reconnaissance, strike and electronics warfare. In June 1973 he received his first assignment to Air Force Systems Command headquarters as deputy chief of staff for development plans. He became deputy chief of staff for systems in October 1973 and was appointed vice commander in August 1975.

He was commander of the Electronic Systems Division, Hanscom Air Force Base, Massachusetts, from May 1977 to January 1981. He assumed command of AFSC in February 1981. Marsh retired on July 31, 1984.

His military decorations and awards include the Air Force Distinguished Service Medal with oak leaf cluster, Legion of Merit, Air Force Commendation Medal with oak leaf cluster, Air Force Organizational Excellence Award with two oak leaf clusters and Army Good Conduct Medal. He also wears the Master Missile Badge.

== Effective dates of promotion ==
Insignia	Rank	Date
	General	February 1, 1981
	Lieutenant general	August 1, 1975
	Major general	April 24, 1974
	Brigadier general	September 1, 1970
	Colonel	March 20, 1966
	Lieutenant colonel	July 15, 1963
	Major	April 28, 1959
	Captain	April 1, 1953
	First lieutenant	January 5, 1951
	Second lieutenant	June 3, 1949

== Death ==
Marsh died on December 28, 2017, in Potomac Falls, Virginia. He was 92. He was buried in the Arlington National Cemetery in Arlington, Virginia.
