= Robert H. Marsh =

American politician

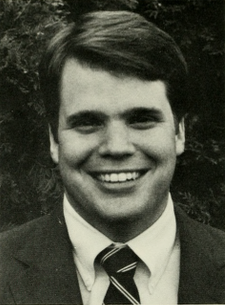
- Robert H Marsh

Member of the Massachusetts House of Representatives from the 14th Norfolk District
- In office 1987–1992
- Preceded by: Royall H. Switzler
- Succeeded by: Peter E. Madden

Personal details
- Born: August 15, 1959 (age 67) Boston, Massachusetts
- Party: Republican
- Education: Hobart College
- Occupation: Political Aide; Politician

Robert H. Marsh (born August 15, 1959 in Boston) is an American politician who represented the 14th Norfolk District in the Massachusetts House of Representatives from 1987 until he resigned in 1992 to work for United States Secretary of Transportation Andrew Card.

After working for Card, Marsh served as Congressman Peter I. Blute's chief aide and ran Mitt Romney's 1994 Senate campaign. In 1997 he was appointed by Governor William Weld to the Massachusetts Port Authority board.

Prior to being elected to the General Court, Marsh served as a legislative aide to State Representative Royall H. Switzler.
