= United States Military Standard =

Standards for equipment and products used by the U.S. military

A United States defense standard, often called a military standard, "MIL-STD", "MIL-SPEC", or (informally) "MilSpecs", is used to help achieve standardization objectives by the United States Department of Defense.

Standardization is beneficial in achieving interoperability, ensuring products meet certain requirements, commonality, reliability, total cost of ownership, compatibility with logistics systems, and similar defense-related objectives.

Defense standards are also used by other non-defense government organizations, technical organizations, and industry. This article discusses definitions, history, and usage of defense standards. Related documents, such as defense handbooks and defense specifications, are also addressed.

== Definition of document types ==
Although the official definitions differentiate between several types of documents, all of these documents go by the general rubric of "military standard", including defense specifications, handbooks, and standards. Strictly speaking, these documents serve different purposes. According to the Government Accountability Office (GAO), military specifications "describe the physical and/or operational characteristics of a product", while military standards "detail the processes and materials to be used to make the product." Military handbooks, on the other hand, are primarily sources of compiled information and/or guidance. The GAO acknowledges, however, that the terms are often used interchangeably.

Official definitions are provided by DoD 4120.24, Defense Standardization Program (DSP) Procedures, November 2014, USD (Acquisition, Technology and Logistics):

Acronym	Type	Definition
MIL-HDBK	Defense Handbook	A document that provides standard procedural, technical, engineering, or design information about the materiel, processes, practices, and methods covered by the DSP. MIL-STD-967 covers the content and format for defense handbooks.
MIL-SPEC	Defense Specification	A document that describes the essential technical requirements for military-unique materiel or substantially modified commercial items. MIL-STD-961 covers the content and format for defense specifications.
MIL-STD	Defense Standard	A document that establishes uniform engineering and technical requirements for military-unique or substantially modified commercial processes, procedures, practices, and methods. There are five types of defense standards: interface standards, design criteria standards, manufacturing process standards, standard practices, and test method standards. MIL-STD-962 covers the content and format for defense standards.
MIL-PRF	Performance Specification	A performance specification states requirements in terms of the required results with criteria for verifying compliance but without stating the methods for achieving the required results. A performance specification defines the functional requirements for the item, the environment in which it must operate, and interface and interchangeability characteristics.
MIL-DTL	Detail Specification	A specification that states design requirements, such as materials to be used, how a requirement is to be achieved, or how an item is to be fabricated or constructed. A specification that contains both performance and detail requirements is still considered a detail specification.

For purposes of this article, "military standards" will include standards, specifications and handbooks.

There are also standard names with different letters behind ′MIL-′ like MIL-C-5040H, MIL-E-7016F or MIL-S-901.

== Formats ==
The DOD has standards about the format of standards:

- MIL-STD-961, Defense and Program-Unique Specifications Format and Content
- MIL-STD-962, Defense Standards Format and Content
- MIL-STD-967, Defense Handbooks Format and Content

== History ==
Defense standards evolved from the need to ensure proper performance, maintainability and reparability (ease of MRO), and logistical usefulness of military equipment. The latter two goals (MRO and logistics) favor certain general concepts, such as interchangeability, standardization (of equipment and processes, in general), cataloging, communications, and training (to teach people what is standardized, what is at their discretion, and the details of the standards). In the late 18th century and throughout the 19th, the American and French militaries were early adopters and longtime developmental sponsors and advocates of interchangeability and standardization. By World War II (1939–1945), virtually all national militaries and trans-national alliances of the same (Allied Forces, Axis powers) were busy standardizing and cataloguing. The U.S. AN- cataloguing system (Army-Navy) and the British Defence Standards (DEF-STAN) provide examples.

For example, due to differences in dimensional tolerances, in World War II American screws, bolts, and nuts did not fit British equipment properly and were not fully interchangeable. Defense standards provide many benefits, such as minimizing the number of types of ammunition, ensuring compatibility of tools, and ensuring quality during production of military equipment. This results, for example, in ammunition and food cases that can be opened without tools; vehicle subsystems that can be quickly swapped into the place of damaged ones; and small arms and artillery that are less likely to find themselves with an excess of ammunition that does not fit and a lack of ammo that does.

However, the proliferation of standards also has some drawbacks. The main one is that they impose what is functionally equivalent to a regulatory burden upon the defense supply chain, both within the military and across its civilian suppliers. In the U.S. during the 1980s and early 1990s, it was argued that the large number of standards, nearly 30,000 by 1990, imposed unnecessary restrictions, increased cost to contractors (and hence the DOD, since the costs in the end pass along to the customer), and impeded the incorporation of the latest technology. Responding to increasing criticism, Secretary of Defense William J. Perry issued a memorandum in 1994 that prohibited the use of most military specifications and standards without a waiver. This has become known as the "Perry Memorandum". Many military specifications and standards were canceled. In their place, the DOD directed the use of performance specifications and non-government standards. "Performance specifications" describe the desired performance of the weapon, rather than describing how those goals would be reached (that is, directing which technology or which materials would be used). In 2005 the DOD issued a new memorandum, which eliminated the requirement to obtain a waiver in order to use military specifications or standards. The 2005 memo did not reinstate any canceled military specifications or standards.

According to a 2003 issue of Gateway, published by the Human Systems Information Analysis Center, the number of defense standards and specifications have been reduced from 45,500 to 28,300. However, other sources noted that the number of standards just before the Perry Memorandum was issued was less than 30,000, and that thousands have been canceled since then. This may be due to differences in what is counted as a "military standard".

Another potential drawback of thorough standardization is a threat analogous to monoculture (where lack of biodiversity creates higher risk of pandemic disease) or a ship without bulkhead compartmentalization (where even a small hull leak threatens the whole vessel). If an enemy discovers a drawback in a standardized system, the system's uniformity leaves it vulnerable to complete incapacitation via what might otherwise have been a limited compromise. Also, if standardization promotes use by allies, it may also ease an enemy's task of using materiel that is lost as a prize of war. However, this threat is somewhat academic, as even poorly standardized materiel presents a likelihood of supplying an enemy if overrun.

== Non-exhaustive list of documents ==
A complete list of standards was maintained as Department of Defense Index of Specifications and Standards, up until 1993.

=== MIL-HDBK ===
- Cataloging Handbook H2, definitions for NATO Stock Number Federal Supply Groups and Federal Supply Classes
- Cataloging Handbook H4, a handbook containing vendor CAGE code details
- Cataloging Handbook H6, Item Name Directory for the NATO Codification System
- Cataloging Handbook H8, another handbook containing vendor CAGE code details
- MIL-HDBK-310, GLOBAL CLIMATIC DATA FOR DEVELOPING MILITARY PRODUCTS
- MIL-HDBK-881, Work Breakdown Structures for Defense Materiel Items (WBS)

=== MIL-STD ===
- MIL-STD-12D, Abbreviations for use on drawings, and in specifications, standards and technical documents
- MIL-STD-105, Sampling Procedures and Tables for Inspection by Attributes (withdrawn, see ASTM E2234)
- MIL-STD-130, "Identification Marking of U.S. Military Property"
- MIL-STD-167, Mechanical Vibration of Shipboard Equipment
- MIL-STD-188, a series related to telecommunications
- MIL-STD-196, a specification of the Joint Electronics Type Designation System (JETDS)
- MIL-STD-202, "Electronic and Electrical Component Parts" test methods
- MIL-STD-276, Standard for vacuum impregnation of porous metal castings and powdered metal components
- MIL-STD-348, "Radio Frequency (RF) Connector Interfaces"
- MIL-STD 461, "Requirements for the control of electromagnetic interference characteristics of subsystems and equipment"
- MIL-STD-464, "Electromagnetic Environmental Effects Requirements for Systems"
- MIL-STD-490, "Specification Practices",
- MIL-STD-498, on software development and documentation
- MIL-STD-499, on Engineering Management (System Engineering)
- MIL-STD-704, "Aircraft Electric Power Characteristics"
- MIL-STD-709, Design Criteria Standard for Ammunition Color Coding
- MIL-STD-806, "Graphical Symbols for Logic Diagrams", originally a USAF standard
- MIL-STD-810, test methods for determining the environmental effects on equipment
- MIL-STD-815, standard practice for naming of aircraft rocket engines, 1962. Combined the previous rocket engine naming standard ANA Bulletins 352 and 353
- MIL-STD-879, standard practice for naming aircraft jet and turbine engines, 1968, replacing ANA Bulletin 306
- MIL-STD-882, standard practice for system safety
- MIL-STD-883, test method standard for microcircuits
- MIL-STD-1168, a classification system for ammunition production that replaced the Ammunition Identification Code (AIC) system used during World War II.
- MIL-STD-1234, sampling, inspection, and testing of pyrotechnics
- MIL-STD-1246, particle and molecular contamination levels for space hardware (has been replaced with IEST-STD-CC1246D).
- MIL-STD-1376, guidelines for sonar transducers, specifically piezoelectric ceramics;
- MIL-STD-1388-1A, Logistics support analysis (LSA) (canceled and s/s by MIL-HDBK-502, Acquisition Logistics)
- MIL-STD-1388-2B, DOD requirements for a logistic support analysis record (canceled and s/s by MIL-PRF-49506, Logistics Management Information)
- MIL-STD-1394, this is concerned with the construction quality of hats and is often confused with IEEE 1394.
- MIL-STD-1397, Input/Output Interfaces, Standard Digital Data, Navy Systems
- MIL-STD-1472, Human Engineering
- MIL-STD-1474, a sound measurement for small arms standard
- MIL-STD-1464A, the Army Nomenclature System used in naming weapons and other materiel, like the M16 rifle
- MIL-STD-1553, a digital communications bus
- MIL-STD-1557, standard practice for naming aircraft piston engines, 1974, replacing ANA Bulletin 395
- MIL-STD-1589, "JOVIAL programming language"
- MIL-STD-1661, a Navy standard for naming/designation
- MIL-STD-1750, an instruction set architecture (ISA) for airborne computers
- MIL-STD-1760, smart-weapons interface derived from MIL-STD-1553
- MIL-STD-1812, standard practice for naming all aircraft engines, combining MIL-STD-815, -879, and -1557
- MIL-STD-1815, "Ada programming language"
- MIL-STD-1913, Picatinny rail, a mounting bracket on firearms
- MIL-STD-2045, Connectionless Data Transfer Application Layer
- MIL-STD-2196, pertains to optical fiber communications
- MIL-STD-2361, pertains to digital development, acquisition, and delivery of Army administrative, training and doctrine, and technical equipment publications in SGML.
- MIL-STD-2525, Joint Military Symbology
- MIL-STD-3011, Joint Range Extension Application Protocol (JREAP)
- MIL-STD-6011, Tactical Data Link (TDL) 11/11B Message Standard (Link-11)
- MIL-STD-6013, Army Tactical Data Link-1 (ATDL-1)
- MIL-STD-6016, Tactical Data Link (TDL) 16 Message Standard (Link-16)
- MIL-STD-6017, Variable Message Format (VMF)
- MIL-STD-6040, United States Message Text Format (USMTF)

=== MIL-PRF ===
- MIL-PRF-38534, General Specification For Hybrid Microcircuits.
- MIL-PRF-38535, General Specification For Integrated Circuits (Microcircuits) Manufacturing.
- MIL-PRF-46374, Watch, Wrist: General Purpose.

=== MIL-SPEC ===
- MIL-C-43455, now inactivated standard for M-1965 field jacket.
- MIL-C-5040H, now inactivated standard for Parachute cords.
- MIL-E-7016F, pertains to the analysis of AC and DC loads on an aircraft.
- MIL-I-17563C, Demonstrates a vacuum impregnation sealant is compatible with the application and that the sealant will not degrade or fail over the life of the part.
- MIL-S-901, Shock Testing for Shipboard Equipment.
- MIL-S-82258, on rubber swim fins. "Requirements for swim fins made of gum rubber for wear by military personnel for swimming purposes and for general utility"

== See also ==
- American National Standards Institute
- ASTM International
- International standard
- Institute of Environmental Sciences and Technology (IEST)
- Military technology
- Standardization
- Specification (technical standard)
- Standards organization
- Standardization Agreement (STANAG)
- U.S. Military connector specifications
