= Delamination =

Mode of failure for which a material fractures into layers

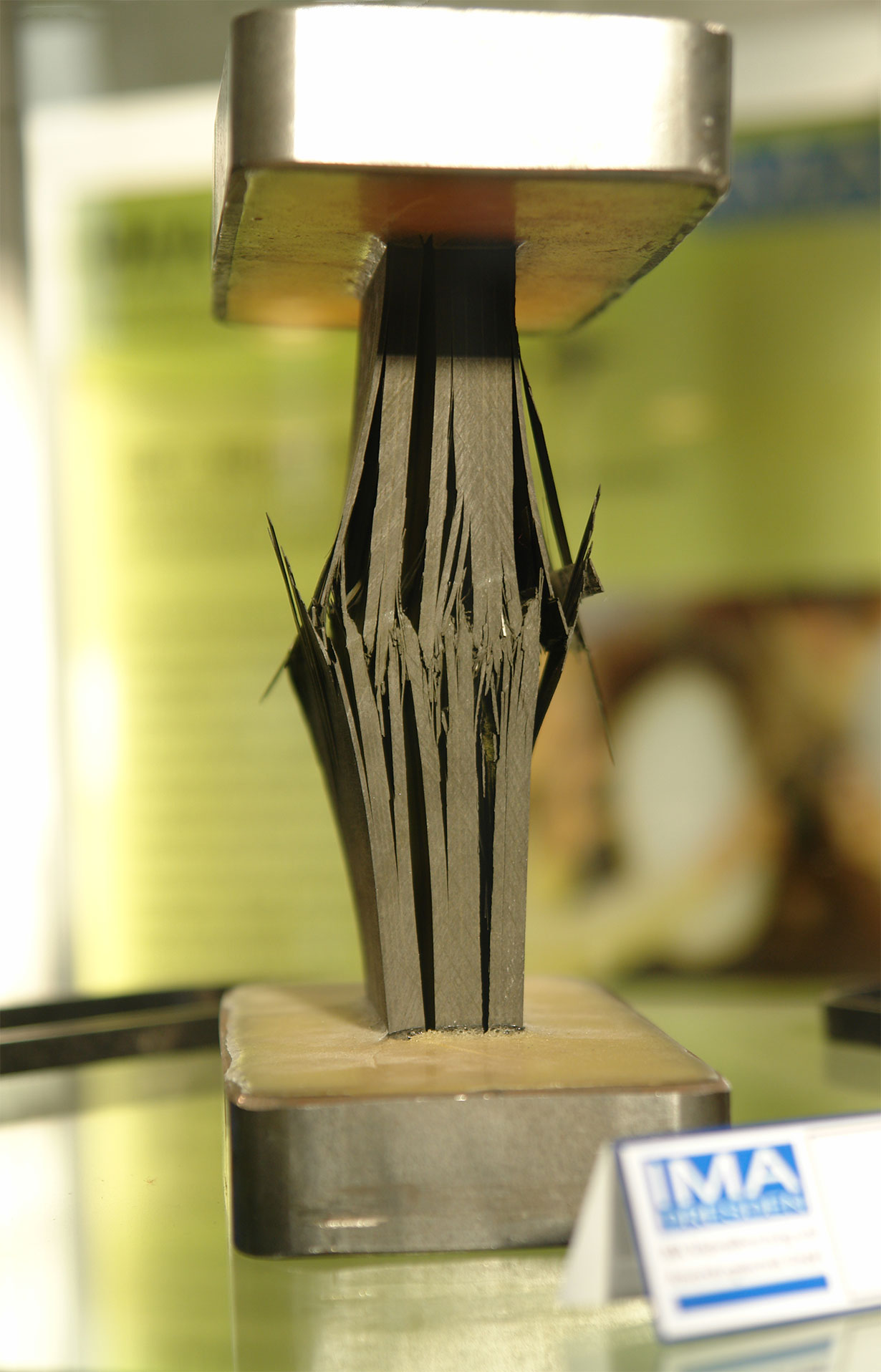
Delamination of carbon fiber–reinforced polymer under compression load

Delamination is a mode of failure where a material fractures into layers. A variety of materials, including laminate composites and concrete, can fail by delamination. Processing can create layers in materials, such as steel formed by rolling and plastics and metals from 3D printing which can fail from layer separation. Also, surface coatings, such as paints and films, can delaminate from the coated substrate.

In laminated composites, the adhesion between layers often fails first, causing the layers to separate. For example, in fiber-reinforced plastics, sheets of high strength reinforcement (e.g., carbon fiber, fiberglass) are bound together by a much weaker polymer matrix (e.g., epoxy). In particular, loads applied perpendicular to the high strength layers, and shear loads can cause the polymer matrix to fracture or the fiber reinforcement to debond from the polymer.

Delamination also occurs in reinforced concrete when metal reinforcements near the surface corrode. The oxidized metal has a larger volume causing stresses when confined by the concrete. When the stresses exceed the strength of the concrete, cracks can form and spread to join with neighboring cracks caused by corroded rebar creating a fracture plane that runs parallel to the surface. Once the fracture plane has developed, the concrete at the surface can separate from the substrate.

Processing can create layers in materials which can fail by delamination. In concrete, surfaces can flake off from improper finishing. If the surface is finished and densified by troweling while the underlying concrete is bleeding water and air, the dense top layer may separate from the water and air pushing upwards. In steels, rolling can create a microstructure when the microscopic grains are oriented in flat sheets which can fracture into layers. Also, certain 3D printing methods (e.g., fused deposition) builds parts in layers that can delaminate during printing or use. When printing thermoplastics with fused deposition, cooling a hot layer of plastic applied to a cold substrate layer can cause bending due to differential thermal contraction and layer separation.

== Inspection methods ==
There are multiple nondestructive testing methods to detect delamination in structures including visual inspection, tap testing (i.e. sounding), ultrasound, radiography, and infrared imaging.

Visual inspection is useful for detecting delaminations at the surface and edges of materials. However, a visual inspection may not detect delamination within a material without cutting the material open.

Tap testing or sounding involves gently striking the material with a hammer or hard object to find delamination based on the resulting sound. In laminated composites, a clear ringing sound indicates a well bonded material whereas a duller sound indicates the presence of delamination due to the defect dampening the impact. Tap testing is well suited for finding large defects in flat panel composites with a honeycomb core whereas thin laminates may have small defects that are not discernible by sound. Using sound is also subjective and dependent on the inspector's quality of hearing as well as judgement. Any intentional variations in the part may also change the pitch of the produced sound, influencing the inspection. Some of these variations include ply overlaps, ply count change gores, core density change (if used), and geometry.

In reinforced concretes intact regions will sound solid whereas delaminated areas will sound hollow. Tap testing large concrete structures is carried about either with a hammer or with a chain dragging device for horizontal surfaces like bridge decks. Bridge decks in cold climate countries which use de-icing salts and chemicals are commonly subject to delamination and as such are typically scheduled for annual inspection by chain-dragging as well as subsequent patch repairs of the surface.

== Delamination resistance testing methods ==
=== Coating delamination tests ===
ASTM provides standards for paint adhesion testing which provides qualitative measures for paints and coatings resistance to delamination from substrates. Tests include cross-cut test, scrape adhesion, and pull-off test.

=== Interlaminar fracture toughness testing ===
Fracture toughness is a material property that describes resistance to fracture and delamination. It is denoted by critical stress intensity factor $K_c$ or critical strain energy release rate $G_c$. For unidirectional fiber reinforced polymer laminate composites, ASTM provides standards for determining mode I fracture toughness $G_{IC}$ and mode II fracture toughness $G_{IIC}$ of the interlaminar matrix. During the tests load $P$ and displacement $\delta$ is recorded for analysis to determine the strain energy release rate from the compliance method. $G$ in terms of compliance is given by

$G = \frac{P^2}{2B}\frac{dC}{da}$ (1)

where $dC$ is the change in compliance $C$ (ratio of $\delta /P$), $B$ is the thickness of the specimen, and $da$ is the change in crack length.

==== Mode I interlaminar fracture toughness ====
Schematic of deformed double cantilever beam specimen.

ASTM D5528 specifies the use of the double cantilever beam (DCB) specimen geometry for determining mode I interlaminar fracture toughness. A double cantilever beam specimen is created by placing a non-stick film between reinforcement layers in the center of the beam before curing the polymer matrix to create an initial crack of length $a_0$. During the test the specimen is loaded in tension from the end of the initial crack side of the beam opening the crack. Using the compliance method, the critical strain energy release rate is given by

$G_{Ic}=\frac{3P_C\delta_C}{2Ba}$ (2)

where $P_C$ and $\delta_C$ are the maximum load and displacement respectively by determining when the load deflection curve has become nonlinear with a line drawn from the origin with a 5% increase in compliance. Typically, equation 2 overestimates the fracture toughness because the two cantilever beams of the DCB specimen will have a finite rotation at the crack. The finite rotation can be corrected for by calculating $G$ with a slightly longer crack with length $a + \Delta$ giving

$G_{Ic}=\frac{3P_C\delta_C}{2B(a + \Delta)}$ (3)

The crack length correction $\Delta$ can be calculated experimentally by plotting the least squares fit of the cube root of the compliance $C^{1/3}$ vs. crack length $a$. The correction $\Delta$ is the absolute value of the x intercept. Fracture toughness can also be corrected with the compliance calibration method where $G_{Ic}$ given by

$G_{Ic}=\frac{nP_C\delta_C}{2Ba}$ (4)

where $n$ is the slope of the least squares fit of $\log(C)$ vs. $\log(a)$.

==== Mode II interlaminar fracture toughness ====
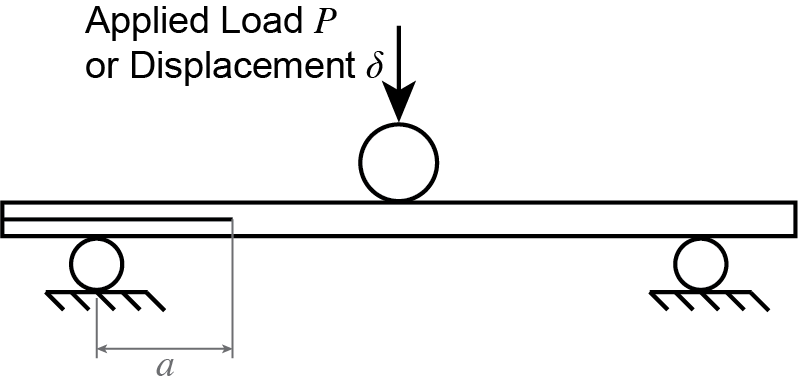
Schematic of edge notch flexure test.

Mode II interlaminar fracture toughness can be determined by an edge notch flexure test specified by ASTM D7905. The specimen is prepared in a similar manner as the DCB specimen introducing an initial crack with length $a_0$ before curing the polymer matrix. If the test is performed with the initial crack (non-precracked method) the candidate fracture toughness $G_Q$ is given by

$$G_Q = \frac{3mP^{2}_{\max}a^{2}_{0}}{2B}$$

where $B$ is the thickness of the specimen and $P_{\max}$ is the max load and $m$ is a fitting parameter. $m$ is determined by experimental results with a least squares fit of compliance $C$ vs. the crack length cubed $a^3$ with the form of

$$C = A + ma^3$$.

The candidate fracture toughness $G_Q$ equals the mode II fracture toughness $G_{IIc}$ if strain energy release rate falls within certain percentage of $G_Q$ at different crack lengths specified by ASTM.

=== Interlaminar shear strength testing ===
Interlaminar shear strength is used as an additional measure of the strength of the fiber-matrix bond in fiber-reinforced composites. Shear-induced delamination is experienced in various loading conditions where the bending moment across the composite changes rapidly, such as in pipes with changes in thickness or bends. Multiple test architectures have been proposed for use in measuring interlaminar shear strength, including the short beam shear test, Iosipescu test, rail shear test, and asymmetrical four-point bending test. The goal of each of these tests is to maximize the ratio of shear stress to tensile stress exhibited in the sample, promoting failure via delamination of the fiber-matrix interface instead of through fiber tension or buckling. The orthotropic symmetry of fiber composite materials makes a state of pure shear stress difficult to obtain in sample testing; thin cylindrical specimens can be used but are costly to manufacture. Sample geometries are thus chosen for ease of machining and optimization of the stress state when loaded.

In addition to manufactured composites such as glass fiber-reinforced polymers, interlaminar shear strength is an important property in natural materials such as wood. The long, thin shape of floorboards, for example, may promote deformation that leads to vibrations.

==== Asymmetric four-point bending ====
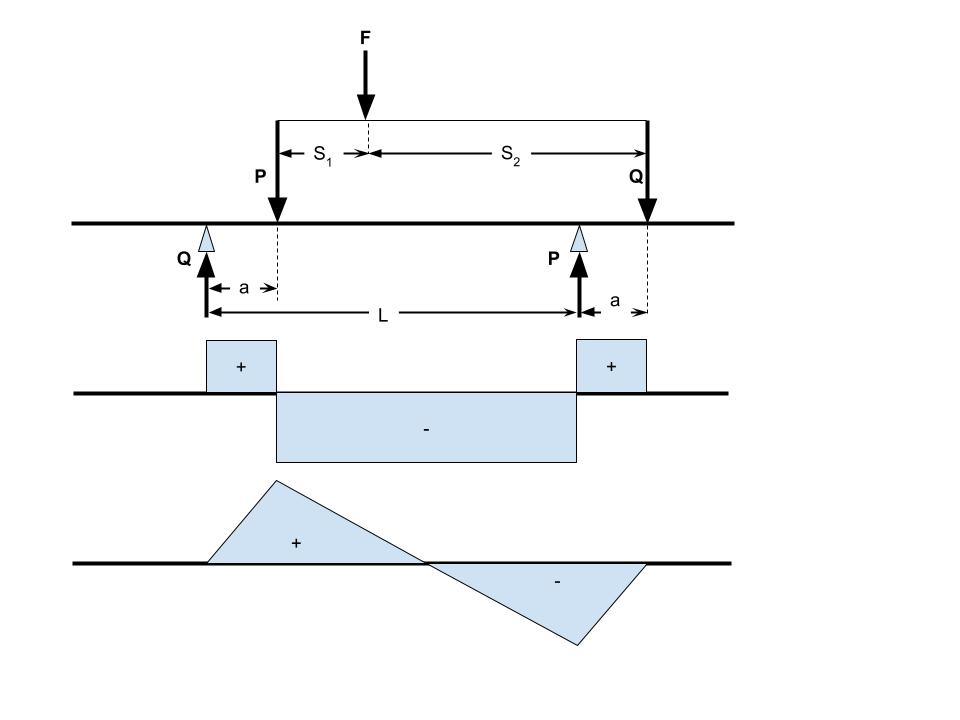
(top-bottom) The point forces, shear stresses, and moments acting on an asymmetric four point bend test sample

Asymmetric four-point bending (AFPB) may be chosen to measure interlaminar shear strength over other procedures for a variety of reasons, including specimen machinability, test reproducibility, and equipment availability. For example, short-beam shear samples are constrained to a specific length-thickness ratio to prevent bending failure, and the shear stress distribution across the specimen is non-uniform, both of which contribute to a lack of reproducibility. Rail shear testing also produces a non-homogeneous shear stress state, making it appropriate for determining shear modulus, but not shear strength. The Iosipescu test requires special equipment in addition to the roller setup already used for other three- and four-point flexural tests.

ASTM C1469 outlines a standard for AFPB testing of advanced ceramic joints, and the method has been proposed to be adapted for use with continuous ceramic matrix composites. Rectangular samples can be used with or without notches machined at the center; the addition of notches helps to control the position of the failure along the length of the sample, but improper or nonsymmetrical machining can result in the addition of undesired normal stresses which reduce the measured strength. The sample is then loaded in compression in its test fixture, with loading applied directly to the sample from 4 loading pins arranged in a parallelogram-like configuration. The load applied from the test fixture is transferred unevenly to the top two pins; the ratio of the inner pin load $P$ and outer pin load $Q$ is defined as the loading factor $\lambda$, such that

$$\frac{P}{Q} = \frac{S_2}{S_1} = \lambda$$,

where $S_1$ and $S_2$ are the lengths from the inner pin to the applied point load and from the outer pin to the applied point load, respectively. The normal stress in the sample $\sigma_{xx}$ is maximized at the locations of the inner pins, and is equivalent to

$$\sigma_{xx} = \frac{6(\lambda-1)FL}{(1+\lambda^2)bt}$$,

where $F$ is the total applied load on the sample, $L$ is the sample length, $b$ is the sample width (into the page as seen in a 2D free-body diagram), and $t$ is the sample thickness. The shear stress $\sigma_{xz}$ in the sample is maximized in between the inner span of the pins and is given by

$$\sigma_{xz} = \frac{3(1- \lambda)F}{2(1+ \lambda)bt}$$.

The ratio of normal to shear stress in the sample $C$ is given by

$$C = \frac{\sigma_{xx}}{\sigma_{xz}} = \frac{4L}{(1+\lambda)t}$$.

This ratio is dependent both on the loading factor of the sample and its length-thickness ratio; both of these quantities are important in determining the mode of failure of the sample in testing.
