= PIND =

A PIND test is a Particle Impact Noise Detection test, performed on high-reliability electronic components to detect loose particles inside of sealed cavities within the device. The test was developed by NASA, McDonnell Douglas, and Texas Instruments before being published under Test Method 2020 in MIL-STD-883. The test provides a nondestructive means of identifying devices containing particles of sufficient mass that upon impact within the cavity, excite the transducer. Particles may be introduced into the device at any point in the manufacturing process up to and including the lid seal operation. Prior to implementation of this test, particle contamination was identified to be responsible for several catastrophic failures of the Delta Launch Vehicle Program.

Common sources of particle contamination include:

- Silicon from die scribing/die removal
- Epoxy flakes from die-attach
- Bond wire
- Weld splatter
- Solder balls

== Test Standards ==
The PIND test is specified in the following standards:

- MIL-STD-883 Test Method 2020
- MIL-STD-750 Test Method 2052
- MIL-STD-202 Test Method 217

These tests are required for certain classes of devices in the generic performance specification standards. MIL-PRF-38535 requires all Class S devices to undergo testing in accordance with MIL-STD-883 TM 2020, condition A. For hybrid devices, MIL-PRF-38534 requires all class K devices to be screened in accordance with MIL-STD-883 TM 2020, conditions A or B. For discrete devices, MIL-PRF-19500 requires testing in accordance with MIL-STD-750 TM 2052, Condition A or B for all JANTX, JANTXV, and JANS devices.

== Test Setup ==
During testing, the device is coupled to a transducer, which is vibrated so that any particles present in the cavity will impact the walls of the device. The output of the transducer is amplified, and fed through a band pass filter to remove system noise and the shaker frequency. This is then fed into a threshold detector, oscilloscope, and speaker. Indication of a particle detected through any of the three outputs constitutes a failure.

The test apparatus consists of the following:

- A threshold detector to detect particle noise exceeding 15±1 mV
- A vibration shaker to and driver to provide sinusoidal motion to the device under test at a 20 g peak at 40-250 Hz for condition A, and 10 g peak at 60 Hz minimum for condition B. For condition A, the frequency used is determined by the formula $f=\sqrt{\frac{20}{0.0511 \cdot D}}$, where D is the average internal package height in inches. This ensures that the particle impacts the cavity wall at maximum acceleration and has been validated in empirical testing.
- PIND Transducer, calibrated to a peak sensitivity of -77.5 ±3 dB referenced to one volt per microbar at a frequency between 150kHz and 160kHz. Device alignment on the transducer is important, as offsets reduce the impact transmissibility.
- A sensitivity test unit for validation of the equipment. This consists of a transducer with the same tolerances as the PIND transducer, and a circuit to produce a 250±20 µV pulse. It is mounted onto the PIND transducer using the same attachment medium as the device under test, and confirmed to trigger a failure.
- PIND electronics, consisting of an amplifier with a gain of 60±2dB centered on the frequency of maximum sensitivity between 150kHz to 160kHz, and a band pass filter centered at approximately 150 kHz.
- Attachment medium, typically a tape or a viscous couplant. Couplants provide superior acoustic transmissibility, but are more difficult to work with.
- Shock mechanism capable of imparting shocks of 1,000 ± 200 g peak to the device under test. During testing, particles may become lodged between the substrate and cavity wall, or stuck to the device walls electrostatically. The shock mechanism works to free trapped particles.

After failure, particles may be removed by the following procedure and evaluated to find the root cause and perform corrective actions. After puncturing the device lid, cover with tape. Vibrate the device until all loose particles are captured in the tape, confirmed by a successful test. The particles can then be examined and characterized by SEM or ESCA.

Empirical verification of the test with devices seeded with particles found that only 40-60% of devices were correctly identified, and found false positives in 10-20% of known clean samples. Accordingly, the test methods in MIL-STD-883 and MIL-STD-750 call for the test to be repeated if failures are detected in >1% of devices, and require a lot failure if >25% of devices fail or the test exceeds 5 rounds.
