= MIL-E-7016F =

The military standard referred to as MIL-E-7016F, Electric Load and Power Source Capacity, Aircraft, Analysis of" addresses the methods and analysis of electric loads and source capacity on military aircraft. The use of the document is approved for use by all departments and agencies of the United States Department of Defense (DoD). Although prepared specifically for DoD applications, the standard may be tailored for commercial applications as well.

== Scope of the Specification ==
The MIL-E-7016F specification covers the methods and requirements for preparing alternating current (AC) and direct current (DC) electric load and power source capacity analyses for aircraft.

== Lead Standardization Agency ==
The MIL-E-7016F specification is maintained by the United States Air Force's Oklahoma City Air Logistics Center who is chartered under the Defense Standardization Program (DSP) with maintaining the functional expertise and serving as the DoD-wide technical focal point for the specification. The current document revision (2009) is Revision F (i.e. MIL-E-7016F) which was issued on July 20, 1976. It was subsequently amended (Amendment 1) on March 18, 1981, and was last validated on April 15, 1988.

== Related Documents ==
- The document MIL-W-5088L, MILITARY SPECIFICATION: WIRING, AEROSPACE VEHICLE covers all aspects from the selection through installation of wiring and wiring devices used in aerospace vehicles (i.e., airplanes, helicopters, lighter-than-air vehicles, and missiles).
- The document MIL-STD-704, DEPARTMENT OF DEFENSE INTERFACE STANDARD: AIRCRAFT ELECTRIC POWER CHARACTERISTICS establishes the requirements and characteristics of aircraft electric power provided at the input terminals of electric utilization equipment. MIL-HDBK-704-1 through-8 defines test methods and procedures for determining airborne utilization equipment compliance with the electric power characteristics requirements defined herein. Electromagnetic interference and voltage spikes are not covered by this standard.

== References and external links ==
- "MIL-E-7016F (NOTICE 1), MILITARY SPECIFICATION: ELECTRIC LOAD AND POWER SOURCE CAPACITY, AIRCRAFT, ANALYSIS OF" (PDF). United States Department of Defense. 15 Apr 1988.
- "MIL-E-7016F (AMENDMENT 1), MILITARY SPECIFICATION: ELECTRIC LOAD AND POWER SOURCE CAPACITY, AIRCRAFT, ANALYSIS OF" (PDF). United States Department of Defense. 18 Mar 1981.
- "MIL-E-7016F, MILITARY SPECIFICATION: ELECTRIC LOAD AND POWER SOURCE CAPACITY, AIRCRAFT, ANALYSIS OF" (PDF). United States Department of Defense. 20 Jul 1976.
