= U.S. Military connector specifications =

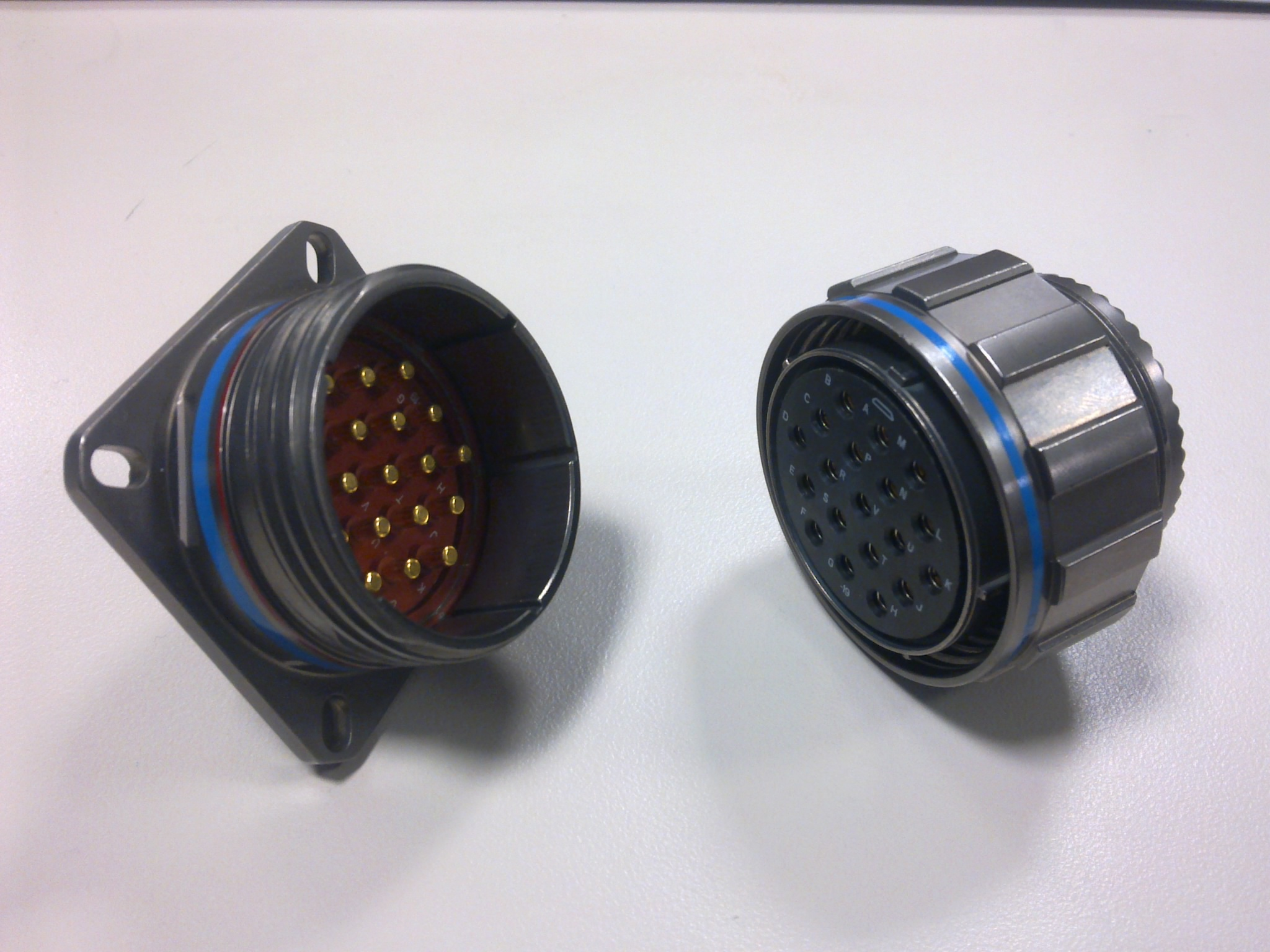
A MIL-DTL-38999 circular connector plated with a nickel–teflon composite. Left: plug (male) type connector; Right: receptacle (female) type connector)

Electrical or fiber-optic connectors used by U.S. Department of Defense were originally developed in the 1930s for severe aeronautical and tactical service applications, and the Type "AN" (Army-Navy) series set the standard for modern military circular connectors. These connectors, and their evolutionary derivatives, are often called Military Standard, "MIL-STD", or (informally) "MIL-SPEC" or sometimes "MS" connectors. They are now used in aerospace, industrial, marine, and even automotive commercial applications.

== Characteristics ==
Connectors usually consist of (i) a mating pair (plug and receptacle) each equipped with male (pin) or female (socket) contacts; note that at least one of the connector halves, or its contacts, should be floating to minimize mechanical stresses.

- Electrical connector contacts are typically beryllium copper (BeCu) or phosphor bronze which is then plated with gold or some other non-corrosive, highly-conductive metal. The contacts are contained by a dielectric insulator (typically a layered construct of various polymers or glass depending upon connector series and manufacturer, and often known as the insert) and are housed in an enclosure (i.e., shell), that is often aluminum and plated or anodized for corrosion protection. The contacts may be captive or removable using a special tool. The electrical connection into the system at the contact terminal is either a soldered or crimped connection. The seal between the shell and insert may be moisture resistant or a hermetic seal. The inserts in each connector half must be oriented for correct mating, and the shell or insert usually contains a keying feature to prevent mis-mating that could damage the connector or result in an electrical problem. Cable clamps and other mounting hardware may be provided, and the mated halves are usually secured by a locking mechanism to prevent disengagements.
- Fiber optic connectors are typically plugs or so-called male connectors with a protruding ferrule that holds the fibers and aligns two fibers for mating. They use a mating adapter to mate the two connectors that fits the securing mechanism of the connectors (bayonet, screw-on or snap-in.) A primary specification issue for fiber optic connectors is insertion loss, i.e., the amount of light lost in the connection expressed in dB.

== Electrical connectors ==
- MIL-DTL-5015 (formerly MIL-C-5015) describes threaded circular connectors with solderable or crimped contacts for commercial and military use. They are commonly used for electronics, electrical power, and control circuits, owing to their versatility, reliability, and ease of supply. MIL-DTL-5015 products are divided into four series, and many classes of connectors are available for a broad range of applications. Connectors rated for −55 °C (−67 °F) up to 200 °C (392 °F) are available. There are around 160 insert arrangements provided in MIL-STD-1651, with up to 81 pins. The basis for MIL-DTL-5015 emerged in the 1930s, but it has now been officially superseded by SAE-AS50151.
- MIL-DTL-12520 (formerly MIL-C-12520) describes the general requirements for a series of centerlock screw coupling, waterproof, polarized, multicontact connectors and accessories for inter-connection of power and control circuits on electronic equipment that are intended primarily for ground or shore use. Resistant to contamination of dust, dirt, and water, these harsh environment connectors also provide the resistance to shock and vibration via the center-locking screw, which is easily secured by turning the mechanized fold-down, wing-blade handle. The insert arrangements are provided in the specification.
- MIL-DTL-22992 (formerly MIL-C-22992) describes multi-contact, heavy duty, quick disconnect, waterproof, electrical plug and receptacle connectors and associated accessories for electronic and electrical power and control circuits. The connectors are rated for −55 to +125 °C. These connectors are intended for use as follows: (i) Class C connectors are intended for external interconnection use on vans, shelters, trailers, buildings and heavy duty applications; (ii) Class J connectors are used in Class C applications where a wire support grommet is necessary; (iii) Class L connectors are intended for power connections from 40 to 200 amperes where heavy duty, waterproof and arc quenching ability are required; and (iv) Class R connectors are used as general purpose heavy-duty connectors where pressurization and arc quenching ability are not required. The insert arrangements are provided in MIL-STD-1651, with additional arrangement for high-current applications provided in the associated MS sheets.
- MIL-DTL-24308 (formerly MIL-C-24308 and MIL-PRF-24308) describes non-environmental, polarized shell, miniature, rack and panel connectors having pin and socket, crimp (removable), solder (non-removable), or insulation displacement (non-removable) contacts with rigid or float mounting, designed for −55 °C to +125 °C operating temperature range. Also called D-subminiature or D-sub connectors, they are designed primarily for applications where space and weight are of major importance while accommodating a large number of circuits in proportion to their size which makes them well suited for aircraft, missiles and related ground support systems. Although MIL-DTL-24308 connectors are primarily designed for rack and panel applications, these connectors can also be adapted for other cabling requirements by addition of accessories and integral clamps. These connectors are intended for general military use as follows: (i) Classes G and N connectors are intended for use in applications where the operating temperature range of −55° to +125 °C is experienced; Class N connectors are used in applications where the presence of residual magnetism must be held to low levels; (iii) Class H receptacles are used where atmospheric pressures must be contained across the wall or panels on which the connectors are mounted; and (iv) Classes D, K, and M connectors are for high-reliability space applications. The insert arrangements are provided in the specification.
- MIL-DTL-26482 (formerly MIL-C-26482) describes the general requirements for two series of environment resisting, quick disconnect, miniature, circular electrical connectors (and accessories). Each series includes hermetic receptacles. The two series of connectors are intermateable when using power contacts and are not intermateable when using shielded contacts. The various connector classes and types include: (i) Classes E, F, J, and P connectors are used in environment-resisting applications with an operating temperature range of −55 to +125 °C (-67 to +257 °F); and (ii) Class H receptacles are used applications wherein pressures must be contained across the walls or panels on which the connector is mounted. Many applications for this connector deviate from the official military specification; for an example, a robust metallic shell based on the MIL-DTL-26482 design supports the use of Ethernet 10/100/1000BaseT data communications networks in harsh environments while maintaining compatibility with IEC 60603-7-7 requirements. MIL-DTL-26482 include two series of circular connectors: Series I includes MS3110, MS3111, MS3112, MS3114 and MS3116 connectors, while Series II includes MS3470, MS3474, MS3475 and MS3476 connectors. The insert arrangements are provided in MIL-STD-1669.
- MIL-DTL-32139 describes nanominiature connectors terminated on printed circuit boards or attached to cable assemblies. These connector's contacts are densely packed with 0.64 mm (0.025 inch) spacing between contact centers in the same row. These connectors are intended for interconnections on printed wiring board (PWB), PWB-to-cable, cable-to-panel, or cable-to-cable on miniaturized equipment sub-assemblies with low power requirements. The connectors are militarily unique because of requirements to operate satisfactorily under sinusoidal vibrations of 10-to-2000 Hz at up to 20 g's, to withstand 48-hours of salt spray without exposure of base metals affecting performance or causing pitting/porosity of the finish; to withstand 100 g's of shock with no electrical discontinuity; and to operate at temperatures of −55 to +125 °C. The insert arrangements are provided in the associated specification sheets.
- MIL-DTL-38999 (formerly MIL-C-38999) describes four series of miniature, high density, bayonet, threaded, or breech coupling, circular, environment resistant, electrical connectors using removable crimp or fixed solder contacts, and are capable of operation within a temperature range of −65 to +200 °C. The connectors are intended for use as follows: (i) Series I connectors are used where a quick disconnect coupling system is required for blind mating or other mating problem areas, and these connectors provide high-vibration characteristics and are suitable for severe wind and moisture problem (SWAMP) areas with proper connector accessories; (ii) Series II connectors are used where the connector is not subjected to high vibration or SWAMP areas and where space or weight is at a premium due to their lower profile; (iii) Series III connectors are suitable for blind mating areas, and provide high-vibration characteristics at elevated temperature and are suitable for SWAMP areas with the proper connector accessories; and (iv) Series IV connectors are used where a quick disconnect coupling system is required for blind mating or other mating problem areas, and these connectors provide high-vibration characteristics and are suitable for SWAMP areas with the proper connector accessories. These connectors are lightweight, coupled by a Breech Lok mechanism, and are all scoop proof with the exception of series II which are non-scoop-proof. The insert arrangements are provided in MIL-STD-1560.
- MIL-DTL-55116, Miniature Audio, Five-Pin and Six-Pin connectors used on radios and fill devices.
- MIL-DTL-83513 (formerly MIL-C-83513) describes polarized shell, micro-miniature, rectangular electrical connectors with solder or non-removable crimp contacts. The connector meets demanding applications and harsh environments and it is mechanically robust and durable, with low contact resistance, high current capability and high dielectric strength, and it has an excellent resistance to shock and vibration, while offering a high pin density, small size and lightweight body. Often referred to as a Micro-D connector system, the connector is suited to a multitude of systems where weight, miniaturization or signal transmission integrity are paramount, such as missiles and their guidance systems, aerospace avionics, radars, shoulder-launched weapon systems, advanced soldier technology systems, military Global Positioning Systems, satellites, medical devices and down-hole drilling tools. The insert arrangements are provided in the associated specification sheets. The Micro-D form factor has become so popular among engineers and systems designers that many manufacturers have begun to offer high speed (up to 10 Gbit/s) and modular versions of the connector.
- MIL-DTL-83527, (formerly DoD-C-83527 and MIL-C-83527) describes the requirements, quality assurance criteria and test procedures for the design and fabrication of an environment resisting low insertion force, multiple insert rectangular connector used in the electrical/electronic bay areas of military aircraft. The connector provides the electrical interface between the avionics equipment and the equipment rack or tray. These connectors are military unique because they must operate satisfactory at high altitude 50,000 feet (15.2 km), endure 500 hours of salt spray, vibration testing (functional and endurance), shock (30 g's), and temperatures from −65 to +125 °C. These connectors must be used in conjunction with DoD-STD-1842 which describes the insert arrangements for use with MIL-DTL-83527 Rack-to-Panel connectors. The insert arrangements are provided in DOD-STD-1842.
- MIL-DTL-83538, (formerly MIL-C-83538) describes connectors and accessories, electrical, circular, umbilical. The connector assembly provides the necessary connections required to meet a MIL-STD-1760, Class I electrical interface between stores and their associated launchers using a "blind mating" mechanism. The connector assembly consists of a receptacle installed on the launcher, a receptacle installed on the store, and a buffer plug installed between the two receptacles. This specification also includes the required mounting adapters and nut, accessory adapter, cable bushing, and protective covers. This connector assembly provides the transfer of MIL-STD-1760 interface class I electrical signals and power between an aircraft (or ground vehicle) mounted launcher and an associated store. This connector is military unique because it is intended to be used on rail and eject launchers where engagement/disengagement of the launcher receptacle (with attached buffer plug) to the store receptacle will be via a blindmate mechanical mechanism; whereas no known commercially equivalent substitute is available. The insert arrangement is 25-20 of MIL-STD-1560.

== Fiber optic connectors ==
- MIL-C-83522 is a military specification describing the characteristics, performance and testing criteria for single terminus fiber-optic connectors. The specification covers families of both bulkhead and cable termination configurations. The connectors must have consistent optical performance, and must be supplied under a MIL-STD-790 reliability assurance program. Statistical process control (SPC) techniques are required in the manufacturing process to minimize variation in the final product. These connectors are intended for use in fixed plant locations, tactical, aerospace and spaceflight avionics, shipboard, ground vehicle, and other specialized military applications.
- MIL-DTL-83526, (formerly MIL-C-83526) is a military specification describing the characteristics, performance and testing criteria for an environmental resistant, hermaphroditic interface, fiber-optic circular connector. The connectors covered have a consistent and predictable optical performance using low loss optical fiber cables in military, ground-based, fiber-optic data transmission systems, and are sufficiently rugged to withstand military field applications. This specification includes expanded-beam fiber-optic connectors.

== Additional connectors ==
Selection of connector alternatives that are not defined by military specifications (MIL-C or MIL-DTL) can use either designated performance specifications (MIL-PRF) issued by the Department of Defense (DoD) or by using Commercial Item Descriptions (CID) issued by the General Services Administration (GSA) pursuant to DoD 4120.24-M, or by using standards developed by nationally and internationally recognized technical, professional, and industry associations and societies, collectively referred to as "Non-Government Standards Bodies" (NGSBs).

Performance Specifications: These connector specifications are intended to describe product that is essentially the same quality previously defined by familiar military specifications and built under the DoD's Qualified Manufacturer List (QML) product/supplier controlled system rather than the more-stringent Qualified Product Line (QPL) system.

- MIL-PRF-29504 (formerly MIL-T-29504) is a performance specification describing the general requirements for removable crimp and epoxy type fiber-optic termini for use in connectors and similar components. These termini are unique for military applications and must operate satisfactorily in systems under demanding conditions of 10 g's vibration (10 g's), shock (over 1000 g's), and temperature excursions (from −40 °C to +70 °C).
- MIL-PRF-28876 (formerly MIL-C-28876) is a performance specification describing for circular, plug and receptacle style, multiple removable termini, fiber-optic connectors that are for DoD applications and that are compatible with multiple transmission element cables. This specification describes a family of general purpose, interconnection hardware providing a variety of compatible optical coupling arrangements, and includes connector shells, connector inserts, connector insert retention nuts, connector backshells, and connector dust caps. These connectors are unique for military applications and must operate satisfactorily in systems under demanding conditions of 10 g's vibration (10 g's), shock (over 1000 g's), and temperature excursions (from −40 °C to +70 °C).
- MIL-PRF-39012 (formerly MIL-C-39012) is a performance specification describing the general requirements and tests for Radio Frequency (RF) connectors used with flexible RF cables and certain other types of coaxial transmission lines.
- MIL-PRF-31031 (formerly MIL-C-31031) is a performance specification describing the general requirements and tests for RF connectors used with flexible cables and certain other types of coaxial transmission lines.
- MIL-PRF-49142 (formerly MIL-C-49142) is a performance specification describing the general requirements and tests for RF, triaxial, connectors. These connectors and fittings are intended for use with biaxial cable and can be used for RF applications when more shielding is required, and they can also be used for serial digital transfer.
- MIL-PRF-64266 is a performance specification describing the performance requirements for circular, plug and receptacle style, multiple removable genderless termini, fiber optic connectors for DoD applications—including aerospace and maritime—and that are compatible with multiple transmission element cables. These fiber optic connectors cover a family of general purpose, interconnection hardware providing a variety of compatible optical coupling arrangements, including connector shells, connector inserts, connector backshells, connector backshell accessories, and connector dust caps. All connector styles are designed to assure proper orientation of the mating halves prior to mating, and provide engagement between mated shells prior to terminus engagement and have the termini so located as to be protected from handling damage. The plug and receptacle styles permit straight, wall (panel) mounted, jamnut mounted, right angle and other connector configurations.

Commercial Item Descriptions (CID): CIDs are specifications describing products that are defined by the connector manufacturer's specification versus a military specification. These products may not be suitable for environmentally severe or critical, communication or tactical military applications; however the items may be an acceptable cost effective choice in less demanding military or commercial applications.
