= Marathon Watch =

Canadian watch manufacturer

Marathon Watch Company Ltd.
- Industry: Watchmaking
- Founded: 1939
- Founder: Morris Wein
- Key people: Mitchell Wein (current president) Leon Wein (former president)
- Website: marathonwatch.com

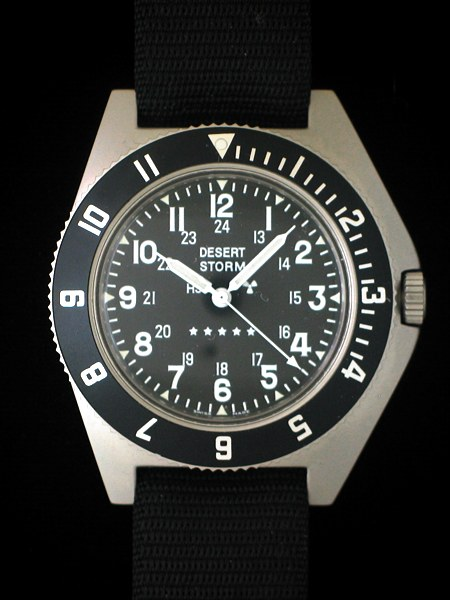
Desert Storm Wristwatch (1990) prototype. Final version supplied under the Marathon label.

Marathon Watch Company Ltd. is a Canadian watch manufacturer founded in 1939. Its predecessor company, Weinstrum Watch, later to be named Wein Brothers, was founded in 1904. The company is part of the broader Wein family watchmaking tradition, which also includes the Chicago-based Hampden Watch, founded in 1922 and still operated by the family today.

Marathon started supplying watches to the Allies of World War II in 1941. Today Marathon manufactures watches that conform to United States Military Standard MIL-PRF-46374G, as well as those of other nations. Marathon is the sole supplier of watches to the United States Armed Forces.

Marathon watches are issued to US military personnel, but are also available to the general public.

Marathon watches are designed in Canada and manufactured in Switzerland by in La Chaux-de-Fonds and therefore watches bear the designation "Swiss Made" on the dial.
