= MIL-PRF-38535 =

MIL-PRF-38535 is a United States military specification that establishes the general performance and verification requirements of single die integrated circuit device type electronics. It is a performance-based specification document defining the general requirements, as well as the quality assurance and reliability requirements, for the manufacture of microelectronic or integrated circuits used in military applications and high-reliability microcircuit application programs.

== Origins and Evolution ==
The specification provides the device manufacturer with the flexibility to implement best commercial practices while still providing a product that meets military performance needs. To be granted such privilege, a manufacturer must be certified pursuant to the Qualified Products List (QPL) and the Qualified Manufacturer List (QML) programs. Developed in 1995 pursuant to DoD 4120.24M, the QPL/QML program moved defense procurement processes away from the use of strict detail specifications to a newer system based on industry practices.

== Specification Overview ==
MIL-PRF-38535 allows the device manufacturer the flexibility to implement best commercial practices while still providing a product that meets military performance needs.

- Performance Requirements: The specification establishes the general performance requirements for integrated circuits or microcircuits and the quality and reliability assurance requirements, including the detail requirements, specific characteristics of microcircuits, and other provisions that must be specified in the device specification.
- Quality Assurance: The specification establishes the requirements for microcircuits built on a manufacturing line that is controlled through a manufacturer's quality management (QM) program. The QM program must be certified and qualified by the Government's Qualifying Activity (QA), and can include multiple levels of product assurance (e.g., Radiation Hardness Assurance or RHA).
- Certification and Qualification: The document outlines the requirements that are mandatory for a manufacturer to be listed on a QML. Once listed via a QML technology flow, the manufacturer must continually meet or improve the established baseline of certified and qualified procedures, the QM program, the manufacturer's review system, the status reporting, and quality and reliability assurance requirements for QML products. The document allows the manufacturer to present alternative methods of addressing the requirements although all such changes must be approved by the Qualifying Activity.
- Process Flow Baselines: This specification requires a manufacturer to establish a process flow baseline, and if sufficient quality and reliability data is available, the manufacturer through the QM program and the manufacturer's review system, may modify, substitute, or delete tests.

== Document Structure ==
As a performance specification, the document provides the device manufacturers with an acceptable established baseline to support Government microcircuit application and logistic programs. The basic section of this specification has been structured as a performance specification, which is supplemented with detailed appendices. These appendices provide guidance to manufacturers on demonstrated successful approaches to meeting military performance needs. These appendices are included as a benchmark and are intended to impose performance requirements. For QML microcircuits the manufacturer developed a program plan that meets the performance detailed in these appendices. Appendix A is mandatory for manufacturers of device types supplied in compliance with MIL-STD-883 and forms the basis for QML classes Q and V. Appendix B is intended for space application and is required for V level devices. Appendix C is mandatory for devices requiring RHA. Appendix D is mandatory for statistical sampling, life test, and qualification procedures used with microcircuits.

== RHA levels ==
The specification defines some high dose rate TID total dose Radiation Hardness Assurance levels:

Letter Designator	rad level	Gray level	notes
-			RadTolerant only
	1 krad	10 Gy	no designator
M	3 krad	30 Gy	
	5 krad	50 Gy	no designator
D	10 krad	100 Gy	
P	30 krad	300 Gy	
L	50 krad	500 Gy	
R	100 krad	1 kGy	
F	300 krad	3 kGy	
G	500 krad	5 kGy	
H	1 Mrad	10 kGy	
