= Paint adhesion testing =

Industrial testing process

In the paint and coating industries, paint adhesion testing is often used to determine if the paint or coating will adhere properly to the substrates to which they are applied. Several tests measure the resistance of paints and coatings from substrates: cross-cut test, scrape adhesion, pull-off test, and others.

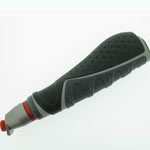
Cross Cut Tester

== Scrape Adhesion Test ==
The scrape adhesion test measures the determination of the adhesion of organic coatings when applied to smooth, flat panel surfaces. It is helpful in giving relative ratings for a number of coated panels showing significant differences in adhesion. The tested materials are applied uniformly to flat panels, mainly some sort of sheet metal. When the materials have dried, the adhesion is determined by pressing panels under a rounded stylus loaded with increasing weight until the coating is removed from the substrate surface.

== Pull-off test ==
The adhesion of a coating or several coated samples of any paint product is measured by assessing the minimum tensile stress needed to detach or rupture the coating perpendicular to the substrate. Unlike the other methods, this method maximizes the tensile stress, therefore, results may not be comparable. The test is done by securing loading fixtures (dollies) perpendicular to the surface of a coating with an adhesive. Then the testing apparatus is attached to the loading fixture and aligned to apply tension perpendicular to the test surface. The force that is applied gradually increases and is monitored until a plug of coating is detached or a previously specified value is reached.

== Cross-cut Test ==
The cross-cut test is a method for determining the resistance of paints and coatings to separation from substrates by utilizing a tool to cut a right-angle lattice pattern into the coating, penetrating to the substrate.

A quick pass/fail test can be accomplished through this method. When testing a multi-coat system, determination of the resistance to separating different layers from one another can be accomplished.

There are two methods described in the ASTM Specification;

=== ASTM D 3359 Test Method A ===
An X-cut is made through the film with a carbide tip tool to the substrate. Pressure-sensitive tape is applied over the cut. Tape is smoothed into place using a pencil eraser over the area of the incisions. Tape is removed by pulling it off rapidly back over itself as close to an angle of 180°. Adhesion is assessed on a 0 to 5 scale.

=== ASTM D 3359 Test Method B ===
A crosshatch pattern is made through the film to the substrate. Detached flakes of coating are removed by brushing with a soft brush. Pressure-sensitive tape is applied over the crosshatch cut. Tape is smoothed into place using a pencil eraser over the area of the incisions. Tape is removed by pulling it off rapidly back over itself as close to an angle of 180°. Adhesion is assessed on a 0 to 5 scale. [0- Greater than 65% area removed & 5 is 0% area removed]

== See also ==
- Painter and decorator
