= STANAG 3910 =

STANAG 3910 High Speed Data Transmission Under STANAG 3838 or Fibre Optic Equivalent Control is a protocol defined in a NATO Standardization Agreement for the transfer of data, principally intended for use in avionic systems. STANAG 3910 allows a 1 Mb/s STANAG 3838 / MIL-STD-1553B / MoD Def Stan 00-18 Pt 2 (3838/1553B) data bus to be augmented with a 20 Mb/s high-speed (HS) bus, which is referred to in the standard as the HS channel: the 3838/1553B bus in an implementation of STANAG 3910 is then referred to as the low-speed (LS) channel. Either or both channels may be multiply redundant, and may use either electrical or optical media. Where the channels use redundant media, these are individually referred to as buses by the standard.

== History ==
The original STANAG 3910, i.e. the NATO standard, reached, at least, draft version 1.8, before work on it was abandoned in the early 1990s in favour of its publication through non-military standardization organizations: the foreword to Rev. 1.7 of the STANAG from March 1990 stated "The main body of this document is identical to the proposed Rev 1.7 of prEN 3910". Following this, several provisional, green-paper versions, prEN 3910 P1 & P2, were produced by working-group C2-GT9 of the Association Europeene des Constructeurs de Materiel Aerospatial (AECMA) (now ASD-STAN), before its development also ceased in 1996-7 (following the withdrawal of the French delegation, who held the chair of AECMA C2-GT9 at the time). As a result, the standard remains (as of Aug. 2013) in green paper form: the latest draft version is prEN3910-001 Issue P1, the front sheet of which states, 'This "Aerospace Series" Prestandard has been drawn up under the responsibility of AECMA (The European Association of Aerospace Industries). It is published on green paper for the needs of AECMA-Members.' However, despite this disclaimer, the document is offered for sale by ASD-STAN, currently (August 2013) at €382.64.

== Utilisation ==
The incomplete nature of the standardization process (as of Aug. 2013) has not prevented at least two versions of STANAG 3910 being implemented: one for the Eurofighter Typhoon and one for the Dassault Rafale. The Eurofighter version, known as EFABus, is standardized by an internal Eurofighter document (SP-J-402-E-1039). The standardization documentation for the Dassault version is unknown.

The EFABus version of STANAG 3910 is known to use an electrical low speed (3838/1553B) control channel and a fibre optic HS channel. The version specified for the Dassault Rafale uses electrical media for both channels.

There are a number of manufacturers of avionic equipment that supply both flight and ground (e.g. test) equipment to this protocol standard.

== Media ==
The (draft) standard contains annexes, known as slash-sheets, that specify a number of different media types for the high-speed and low-speed channels, implementations identifying a specific slash-sheet with the relevant specifications.

=== Optical ===
Versions of STANAG 3910 using optical media for the HS channel component require an additional passive component, in the form of an optical star coupler either reflective or transmissive, to interconnect the remote terminals. This limits the number of remote terminals that may be connected to the HS media, through the effect of the optical star on the optical power (determined by the number of "ways" of the star). Therefore, it may not be possible for all the (up to) 31 RTs (and 1 BC) that may be connected to the LS channel to have HS channel connections.

The optical media types include 200 and 100 μm diameter core (280, 240, or 140 μm cladding) Step-index profile (depressed cladding) optical fibre. These are much larger-core fibres than are commonly used in short-haul commercial applications, which are more normally 50/125 or 62.5/125 μm. This is, in part at least, to reduce the problems associated with contamination of the optical connectors – a given size of particle between the end faces of the fibre in a connector or misalignment of such a connector has significantly less effect on the larger fibre – which is seen as a significant issue in avionic applications, especially where contaminating environments, high vibration, and wide temperature ranges can apply.

The major difference between the transmissive and reflective star coupled fibre networks is that two fibres are needed with the transmissive star coupler to connect a line-replaceable item (LRI), but with the reflective star, and a "Y" coupler internal to the LRI, only a single fibre is required: a "Y" coupler is a three-port optical device that connects the simplex transmitter and simplex receiver to a single fibre that carries the optical signals transmitted and received by the LRI in opposite directions (half duplex). However, while the use of the reflective star reduces the cabling in the aircraft, and thus weight, the excess losses involved in the use of the "Y" couplers and reflective star coupler makes meeting the power budget requirements, given a transmitter power and receiver sensitivity, more difficult.

Whilst it is explicitly stated that the LS buses may be a fibre optic equivalent to STANAG 3838, e.g. MIL-STD-1773, there are no known implementations of this approach.

=== Electrical ===
Versions using an electrical HS channel require an additional active component, in the form of a "central repeater", with multi-tap collector and distributor lines (which use directional couplers to connect to the LRIs) and a buffer memory, to allow for small differences in data rates.

The standard and the electrical media slash sheet it contains specify a 100-ohm characteristic impedance cable for both collector and distributor lines. A maximum cable length is not given for either, and neither are limits on the numbers of directional couplers and thus RTs. However, the losses in the directional couplers, etc., especially for the RT furthest from the central repeater, and the limitations on dynamic range between the furthest (and most attenuated) and nearest (and least attenuated) RT, will limit the number of RTs operating to the standard that may be connected to the HS media.

== System architectures ==
Since STANAG 3910 uses a 3838/1553B LS channel for control, the logical architectures that are supported are very similar to those described for 3838/1553B. Essentially, there is a bus controller (BC) and up to 31 individually addressed (0-30) remote terminals (RTs) connected to the bus. The BC then commands the RTs to receive or transmit the data, either as RT to RT, RT to BC, BC to RT, RT to RTs (broadcast), or BC to RTs (broadcast) transfers.

With electrical media HS buses, the physical architecture is like that with 3838/1553B, save that the central repeater has to be at one end of each of the collector and distributor lines: the RT's connections to these lines work preferentially in one physical direction along the bus - hence directional couplers.

The use of optical media for the HS buses, e.g. in EFABus, has a significant effect on the physical architectures: it is not practical to implement linier T coupled bus architectures, where the bus is run around the platform (e.g. the aircraft), and each line replaceable item (LRI) connects, though a stub, at the nearest convenient point in its path. Rather, each LRI has an optical physical media connection to a common star coupler, which passively connects it to all the other LRIs connected to the same star. In the case of a reflective star, the bus connection from the RT will be a single fibre cable, over which the RT both transmits and receives (half duplex). With a transmissive star, each RT is connected through two fibres, one for it to transmit and one for it to receive data over.

== Transfer sequence ==
Transfers over the HS channel are initiated via the 3838/1553B LS channel, in an analogous way to the setup of 3838/1553B data transfers. 3838/1553B BC-RT transfers are sent to a specific subaddress of the receiving and transmitting RTs by the STANAG 3910 bus controller (BC). Despite this being a subaddress on the LS side of the RT, and thus exactly the same as any other 3838/1553B RT's subaddress, this subaddress is known as the "HS subaddress". The 3838/1553B BC-RT transfers each carry a single data word, known as an HS action word. Each HS action word identifies the HS message to be transmitted or received, analogous to the command words used to initiate 3838/1553B RT transfers. As with 3838/1553B transfers, there can be HS transfers from BC to RT, RT to BC, RT to RT, BC to RTs (broadcast) and RT to RTs (broadcast).

According to the standard, the HS actions words comprise the following:

A single-bit HS A/B field, which indicates on which bus of a dual redundant HS channel the message is to be transmitted and received.
A single-bit HS T/R field, which indicates whether the HS action word is commanding the RT to transmit or receive.
A 7-bit HS message identify/HS mode field. This either indicates that the HS action word is a mode control (value = 0000000) or identifies the subaddress of the HS RT's (which is a different entity from the HS subaddress to which the HS action word is sent) from which the message is to be sent or at which it is to be received, depending on the value of the HS T/R field.
A 7-bit HS block count (BLC) or HS mode code field, which "shall be the quantity of Data Blocks to be either sent out or received by the RT on the HS Channel or the HS Mode Code". The standard goes on to say "The message shall consist of 32 Data Words per Data Block and a maximum of 2^{7} Data Blocks may be transmitted or received".

As a 3838/1553B data word, the HS action word is preceded by the 3 bit-time data word sync field and followed by the single bit parity bit. As part of a 3838/1553B BC-RT transfer, it is preceded by a 3838/1553B command word, and should normally, i.e. if not broadcast, invalid, or illegal, elicit a 3838/1553B status word from the receiving RT.

In the case of an RT to RT HS transfer, the BC sends an HS action word to the receiving HS RT, instructing it to receive the HS message with a specified block count value at the specified subaddress. The receiving RT will then reply on the LS channel with an LS status word indicating it received the HS action word. The BC will then, after an intermessage gap on the LS channel, send another HS action word to the transmitting HS RT, instructing it to transmit the message, normally with the same block count value, and from one of its subaddresses. The transmitting RT will then reply on the LS channel with an LS status word indicating it received the HS action word and completing the HS control format. The HS RT transmitting an HS message will then begin its transmission within a maximum time measured from the parity (last) bit of the transmit HS action word. This initialization time is specified in the slash sheets, though all those in the current, draft standard are 24 to 32 μS. If the receiving HS RT does not receive the start of the HS message within a specified (in the slash sheet) time, which should be sufficient for the duration of the HS control format and the initialization time of the transmitter, it is required to timeout.

According to the standard, HS messages comprise the following:

A preamble which is equivalent to a sequence of binary ones encoded with a method equivalent to Manchester II bi-phase encoding, and which "is primarily used by the receiving HS MIU [RT interface] to acquire signal level and synchronization by using a known pattern." This is needed because, as a shared media protocol, these signal levels and data transmission rates will vary slightly between transmitters. The number of bits in the preamble can be specific to the implementation, i.e. is selected by a system's designers.
A start delimiter (SD) which is 4 bit times long, but is formatted as a specific pattern that is an illegal Manchester II bi-phase signal, so that it may always be distinguished from the data.
A frame control (FC) field in 8 bits carrying a fixed value. This field exists for compatibility with other protocols using similar protocol data units (PDUs).
A physical address (PA) field in 8 bits carrying the RT address of the STANAG 3838 source RT.
A destination address (DA) in 16 bits, which may be subdivided into an RT address in 7 bits and subaddress in 8 bits or may contain a 15-bit logical address.
A word count (WC) in 16 bits that is required to contain the actual length of the information payload field (see below) of the message in words.
A frame information payload (info) field that may contain up to 4096 words, each of 16-bits. This info field is organized into blocks of 32 words, and the HS action word, rather than indicating the length of the message to be received or transmitted in words, specifies the number of blocks.
A frame check sequence (FCS) word, which "provides a check for errors in the message" and covers "the FC, PA, DA, WC, INFO, and the FCS fields."

The FC, PA, DA, WC, INFO, and the FCS fields are all required to be formatted as valid Manchester II bi-phase signals.
There are no explicit delimiters or separators between the fields of the PDU or the blocks or words in the info field, and all are required to be transmitted contiguously.

An end delimiter (ED) field, which is 4 bit times long and, like the SD field, is an illegal Manchester II bi-phase signal that may always be distinguished from the data.

While the WC fields [sic] are required to contain the actual lengths of the following info fields in words, if the receiving RT implements a feature called "word count checking", then the length of the info field may be less than 32 times the block count value in the HS action word by up to 31 words. In effect, the last block of an HS message may vary in length from 1 to 32 words. If the receiving terminal does not implement word count checking then the length of the info field shall be the block count multiplied by 32. The standard does not indicate how the transmitting terminal is meant to know whether the receiving RT implements this feature or not; hence it may be assumed to be part of the system's design.

There are also, analogous to the 3838/1553B status words, HS status words. These are also 3838/1553B data words sent over the LS channel, from the HS subaddress to which the HS action words are sent. The status words are therefore, unlike with 3838/1553B statuses, not transmitted automatically by the RTs, and require the STANAG 3910 BC to cause their transmission over the LS channel from the same HS subaddress the action words are sent to.

The HS subaddress, to which the HS action words are sent, and from which HS status words and HS ???? words are transmitted, is not specified by the standard, other than it "shall not be equal to 00000 or 11111 [binary] and shall not be used for any other function". It may then, be selected for the specific implementation, i.e. a value that is not otherwise in use.

It also is possible to have "normal" 3838/1553B transfers that take place over the LS channel alone, and which may use any of the other 3910/1553B subaddresses. These transfers may happen in parallel with the HS channel transfers or be in between them. It is, however, common practice not to use the LS channel other than for control of the HS, and for LS mode commands, etc., e.g. during BC handover.

The duration of an HS control format initiating an HS RT to HS RT transfer over the HS channel comprises a pair of 3838/1553B BC-RT transfers, including command words, data words (the HS action words themselves), LS status responses, LS RT response times, and an inter message gap (which is limited by, but is not necessarily the same as the 3838/1553B specified minimum intermessage gap of 4 μs). As a consequence, the duration of such a HS control format can be relatively long in comparison to the duration of the HS transfer that follows. This overhead is then compounded where the BC initiates an RT to BC transfer on the LS channel to, e.g., obtain the HS status word from the receiver. It is technically possible to begin the setup of the next HS transfer while the previous one is in progress, and thus achieve the minimum permitted HS interframe gap of 4 μs. However, it is common practice to wait for one HS transfer to end before beginning the LS channel transfers to set up the next, as predicting the timing of the end of a transmission is complicated by the possible variations in transmitter bit rates. Thus, while the theoretical throughput approaches 21 (20 + 1) Mbps, the actual throughput will be significantly less than 20 Mbps.

== Developments ==
There is also an extended version of EFABus, known as EFABus Express (EfEx). This was designed for tranche 2 of the Eurofighter Typhoon to reduce the time needed to set up the HS transfers by allowing them to be set up over the HS channel. This version is fully compatible with MIL-STD-1553 / STANAG 3838 and the mixed EFABus (STANAG 3910).

Since the setup of HS transactions over an EfEx channel occurs between the HS transfers themselves, like the implementations of STANAG 3910 that wait for the preceding HS transfer to complete before initiating the next, the maximum bandwidth is necessarily less than 20 Mbps; though it is higher than that of this type of STANAG 3910 channel, because the HS control formats on the HS channel require less time than those on the LS channel. However, where a STANAG 3910 channel implementation performs the setup of an HS transfer in parallel with the preceding one, an implementation of STANAG 3910 could provide a very slightly higher throughput than an EfEX implementation, even allowing for the longest possible transmission of the HS message at the lowest possible data transmission rate. Also, assuming that the RTs met the requirements of the standard for a minimum 4 μs interframe gap time, this should have meant modifying only the BC to predict the end times of the HS messages, and initiate the HS control just before this; rather than modifying both the BC and multiple RTs to send and receive HS control formats on the HS channel.

== Competing protocols ==
Another proposed development of MIL-STD-1553 is known as MIL-STD-1553E or E-1553. This uses technologies similar to those used in ADSL to transmit very much higher bandwidths, in multiple channels, over the same media as the existing data bus, but in such a way that they do not interfere with the operation of the normal 1553B data transfers or RTs that should not be involved in them. MIL-STD-1553E is, therefore, an attractive option for upgrading existing aircraft, etc., that use 1553B, because it should not involve any modification to the wiring or any RTs that are not required to take part in these high-speed transfers.

However, whilst there has been some research into its use, there do not appear to be any existing or impending implementations of it on production aircraft, either as new build or upgrades. This may be related to the susceptibility of these additional high-speed transmissions to the specific routeing of the 1553 bus cables, and the exact placement of the couplers, BC, and RTs on different aircraft of a fleet, which may make it difficult to specify, in advance of an upgrade, precisely what additional capacity might be provided.

The E-1553 standard by Edgewater Computer Systems was ratified as STANAG 7221 in 2015. In addition to 1553B, it also runs over coax, twisted pair, Power-Line Carrier, and existing ARINC 429 links. The data rate is 100 Mbps.
