= Bond tester =

Scientific testing instrument

A bond tester is a scientific instrument used to measure the mechanical strength of bonds, evaluate bond strength distributions or determine compliance with specified bond strength requirements of the applicable acquisition document.

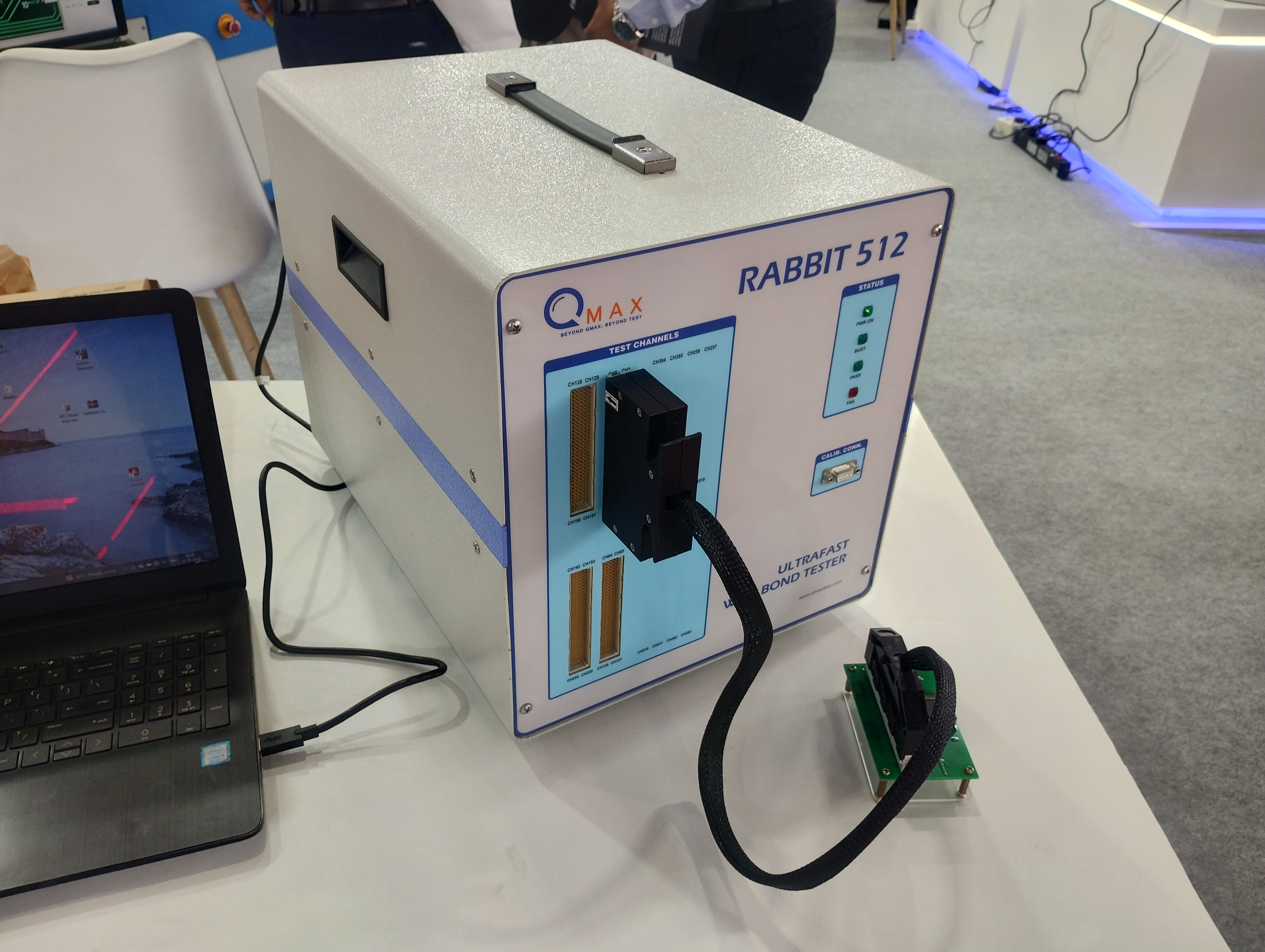
Ultrafast wave bond tester machine at DEF-TECH Bharat 2026, KTPO, Bengaluru

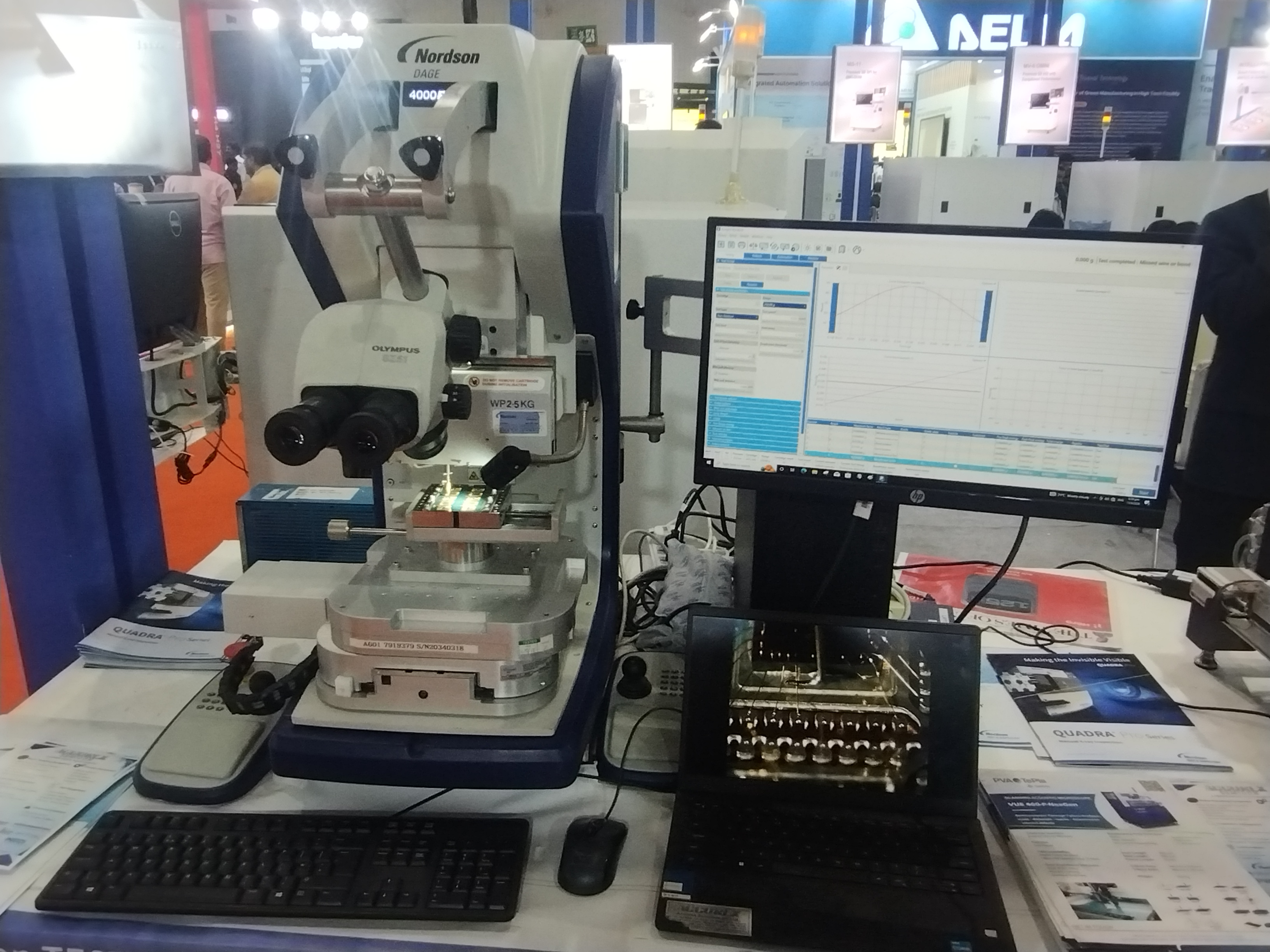
Nordson Test & Inspection 4000 Plus Bondtester at Electronica 2025, BIEC, Bengaluru

== Importance ==
Electrical and thermal bonds are such an integral part of electronic and semiconductor construction that they may often be taken for granted. Modern electronic assembly methods employ a myriad of bonding processes, each one a vital step in the manufacture of the final product. A typical consumer product such as a laptop computer may contain hundreds of thousands of bonds yet if one fails it will probably result in a system breakdown.

== Method ==
There are at least three means of bond testing:

- The thermographic method: one uses a thermo-sensitive phosphor to measure the temperature distribution over a sample's surface.
- The electrode potential method: one uses electrodes to measure the potential difference across a sample.
- The ultrasonic transmission method: one may measure the attenuation of an ultrasonic wave through the sample.

Typically a load is applied to a bond by a hook or shear tool, whereafter a force measurement is taken and the failure mode of the tested sample is recorded. More often than not bond tests are destructive and samples are scrapped after testing. In aerospace and medical applications, non destructive testing is common, whereby the bond is loaded up to a point to reveal nonacceptable bonds while avoiding damage to acceptable bonds.

For an automatic test PC controlled moving table allows any number of bonds to be tested automatically from a stored program. Results can be analysed and output immediately or exported in a number of data base formats for subsequent analysis as desired. Powerful extended capabilities enable measurements such as force/time or force/distance curves to be made and deliver more data about the quality of the bond tested.

The most common test types performed on a bond tester are the wire pull test, which generally puts an upward force on a gold/aluminum/silver/copper wire, and the die shear test, which generally comprises loading a die from the side. When equipped with tweezers, bond testers may also perform cold bump pull tests. During such a test, a solder ball down to 50 μm in diameter is reform it to the shape something like a mushroom and then pulled off the surface. Modern bond testers can perform a wide variety of tests with high precision, because automation eliminates human influence on the measurement.

== Industry leaders ==
Two industry leaders are DAGE (acquired by Nordson in 2006) and xyztec.

== Standards ==
MIL-STD-883, JEDEC and other standards are commonly followed in the industry.
