= MIL-STD-1234 =

MIL-STD-1234 (Military-Standard-1234) is a United States Military Standard that describes the general methods of sampling, inspection, and testing pyrotechnics for conformance with the material requirements of various pyrotechnic specifications.

MIL-STD-1234 was originally approved and published on June 22, 1962 by the Department of Defense. Later, it was revised in 1965, 1967, and 1973.
