= MIL-STD-2361 =

This military standard established the Standard Generalized Markup Language (SGML) and the Extensible Markup Language (XML) requirements for use in Army digital publications. Within this military standard, Army publications SGML/XML requirements are separated by publication types. There are specified sections for administrative publications, training and doctrine publications, technical and equipment publications and Global Combat Support System-Army (GCSS-A). This new publication of the standard contains the XML requirements for Technical Manuals (TM) developed in accordance with the functional requirements contained in MIL-STD-40051-1 and MIL-STD-40051-2, GCSS-A collection and reporting of maintenance data developed in accordance with MIL-STD-3008, and administrative publications developed in accordance with AR 25–30. The XML requirements are applicable for the development, acquisition, and delivery of Electronic and Interactive Electronic Publications (EP/IEP) such as Electronic and Interactive Electronic Technical Manuals (ETM/IETM). The previous SGML for training and doctrine publications functional requirements, developed in accordance with TRADOC Reg 350-70 and TRADOC Reg 25–36, remain unchanged. Specific Interactive Multimedia Instruction (IMI) functionality is currently contained in MIL-PRF-29612, The Development and Acquisition of Training Data Products and TRADOC Reg 350–70, Systems Approach to Training Management, Processes, and Products.
