= MIL-STD-1394 =

MIL-STD-1394 and MIL-STD-1394B are Defense Standards, assigned as "PROVISIONS FOR EVALUATING QUALITY OF CAP CROWNS" by the United States Department of Defense, which control and maintain the specification. Like most mil-specs, they are freely obtainable at government websites. The cap crown is a part of the Combination cap.

MIL-STD-1394 and MIL-STD-1394B are often confused as being variants of IEEE 1394b, otherwise known as FireWire. This confusion is exacerbated by the fact that industry standard SAE AS5643, an aerospace implementation of IEEE 1394b, is also referred to as "MIL1394".
