= MIL-STD-1760 =

US military aircraft stores management system

MIL-STD-1760 Aircraft/Store Electrical Interconnection System defines a standardized electrical interface between a military aircraft and its carriage stores. Carriage stores range from weapons, such as GBU-31 JDAM; air-to-air missiles, such as Bozdoğan; pods, such as AN/AAQ-14 LANTIRN; to drop tanks. Prior to adoption and widespread use of MIL-STD-1760, new store types were added to aircraft using dissimilar, proprietary interfaces. This greatly complicated the aircraft equipment used to control and monitor the store while it was attached to the aircraft: the stores management system, or SMS.

MIL-STD-1760 defines the electrical characteristics of the signals at the interface, as well as the connector and pin assignments of all of the signals used in the interface. The connectors are designed for quick and reliable release of the store from the aircraft. Weapon stores are typically released only when the aircraft is attacking a target, under command of signals generated by the SMS. All types of stores may be released during jettison, which is a non-offensive release that can be used, for example, to lighten the weight of the aircraft during an emergency.

== Signal description ==
There are five main groups of MIL-STD-1760 signals:

1. MIL-STD-704 power connections
2. MIL-STD-1553 data communications interface
3. High and low bandwidth analog signals
4. Discrete signals
5. Fiber optics

Note that the standard describes three groups: A) the signal lines (consisting of the high & low bandwidth, MIL-STD-1553 communications, and fiber optic signals); B) the discrete lines (consisting of the MIL-STD-1553 discretes and other discrete signals); and C) the power lines (which are the same as those described here).

In common practice, an aircraft will support most of the MIL-STD-1760 signals, whereas the store needs to accommodate only those signals it needs to perform its mission. As a result, stores typically use only a subset of the MIL-STD-1760 signals. MIL-STD-1760 was intended to support both current needs as well as to provide growth capability as the technology matures. MIL-STD-1760 defines a Class I aircraft interface, which has four high bandwidth and two fiber optic interfaces, and a Class II interface, which has only two high bandwidth and no fiber optic interfaces.

=== Power connections ===
The MIL-STD-704 power connections provide the store with access to 28 VDC, three-phase wye 400 Hz 115/200 VAC, and 270 VDC aircraft power; it is usual to route only one of the last two supplies, however, if both are made available, then they are never made active simultaneously. The MIL-STD-1760 interface provides power through the primary interface (two off 28 VDC and either one or both 115/200V VAC and 270 VDC), where it is routed to the store along with all of the other signal types. The standard also allows for an optional auxiliary power interface (1 off 28 VDC and either 115/200 VAC or 270 VDC) for stores with more demanding power requirements. The auxiliary power interface includes its own interlock discrete signals so that the aircraft can determine whether the store's auxiliary power connector is attached to the aircraft.

=== Data communication ===
MIL-STD-1553 is a military standard for the Digital time division command/response multiplex data bus that has been used since the 1970s for data communications between avionics devices on American military aircraft. It is a dual-redundant differential serial interface that operates at a rate of one megabaud. The MIL-STD-1553 interface includes four signal lines, five lines used to assign one of 31 communications addresses to the store (one address is reserved), and address parity and return lines, for a total of 11 lines.

=== High-speed option ===
To support weapons applications such as digitized video, and transfers of terrain maps, target images, and program files, Revision E of MIL-STD-1760 includes an option for higher speed data communication. This option, the High Speed Network for MIL-STD-1760 (High-Speed 1760), is defined by SAE standard AS5653. High-Speed 1760 specifies a gigabit-speed interface based on Fibre Channel, operating at 1.0625 Gbit/s over a pair of 75 ohm coax cables. The Fibre Channel upper layer protocols for High-Speed 1760 are FC-AE-1553, based on MIL-STD-1553, for command and control messages and file transfers; and FC-AV for video and audio.

=== Analog signals ===
The high and low bandwidth signals are for routing analog signals between the aircraft and the store. Note that either the aircraft or the store can be the source of the signal. The high bandwidth signals are intended for carrying video and other high frequency signals, such as those transmitted by the Global Positioning System (GPS). The low bandwidth signals are intended for carrying audio and other low frequency signals.

=== Discrete signals ===
There are two sets of discrete signals. The Interlock discrete is used by the aircraft to determine whether the store is attached to the aircraft. This interface uses two signals, the Interlock, and the Interlock Return. These signals are simply connected together within the store, and when the store is released from the aircraft this connection is broken on the aircraft side. The aircraft determines the presence of the store by measuring the continuity between the two signals. Certain stores, typically weapons, may be commanded into modes that can be hazardous if not managed properly, such as the arming of a warhead. Activation of the Release Consent discrete signal is used to ensure that the store will only accept such a command when it is authorized to do so.

=== Fiber optic interface ===
The fiber optic interface is intended for much higher digital communications speeds than can be supported by MIL-STD-1553, such as Fibre Channel, which can operate at gigabaud rates.

== Interface usage ==
The MIL-STD-1760 interface is used as follows with a notional weapon that uses GPS for terminal guidance. Prior to activating any of the store's interface signals, the aircraft will examine the interlock discretes to ensure that the store is attached to the aircraft, thereby preventing the ground crew from being subjected to an electrical shock hazard while servicing the aircraft. The interface will be energized to supply the weapon with electrical power when the air crew determines that hostilities are imminent. The weapon electronics will initialize itself, including running a battery of self tests and starting its MIL-STD-1553 communications interface. The weapon will read its address from the settings on its MIL-STD-1760 interface and will start to listen for MIL-STD-1553 commands to that address from the SMS. These commands will commence with requests for the weapon to report its status, and will continue with commands that ready the weapon for its mission, such as navigation initialization and target coordinates. The weapon's GPS receiver will be able to lock onto the signals from GPS satellites and resolve its position much more quickly after it separates from the aircraft if it is initialized with the current position and time. The aircraft may use the MIL-STD-1553 interface to send current position and time to the weapon, and a high bandwidth signal to route the GPS satellite signal from a topside aircraft antenna to the weapon.

Just prior to release, the aircraft activates the Release Consent discrete and sends the weapon an arming command using the MIL-STD-1553 interface. The SMS will verify that the weapon release conditions have all been fulfilled, and it will activate the signals (not part of the MIL-STD-1760 interface) that cause the weapon to be released. In the case of a bomb, this is typically done by energizing an electro-explosive device that simultaneously opens the hooks that hold the bomb on the aircraft during carriage, and also operate a plunger that pushes the bomb away from the aircraft (at high speeds there is a tendency for the weapon to remain in close proximity to the aircraft after the bomb hooks open). The MIL-STD-1760 connector will release as the bomb falls away from the aircraft, and the SMS will detect that the bomb has separated by the open circuit between the Interlock and Interlock Return discrete signals.
