= Bus coupler =

Connection between two power buses

A bus coupler is a device which is used to couple one bus to the other without any interruption in power supply and without creating hazardous arcs. A bus coupler is a breaker used to couple two busbars to perform maintenance on other circuit breakers associated with that busbar.

It is achieved with the help of a circuit breaker and isolators.

== Characteristics ==
MIL-STD-1553B specifies the transformer characteristics and turns ratio of 1.4:1 with the higher turns on the isolation resistor side of the stub. The MIL-STD-1553B also specifies the isolation resistors that are placed in series with each connection to the bus. Normally bus couplers are available with 1.4:1 transformer ratios and 59 ohm (2 watt 1%) resistors. For special applications, couplers can be supplied with different transformer ratios (e.g., 1:1) and other resistance values (e.g., 54.9 ohms).

Bus coupler configurations are available as non-terminated or internally terminated. If two or more non-terminated couplers are used on a bus, then the couplers at each end of the bus must be terminated externally with 78-ohm terminators on the unused bus connections of the end couplers. Alternately, internally single-terminated couplers (with or without the non-functional bus connectors) can be supplied.

Even if only one non-terminated coupler acts as the bus because all devices (bus controller, remote terminals, etc.) are connected to the coupler stubs, the external bus connections of the coupler must be terminated. A dual-terminated coupler (with or without non-functional bus connectors) can be employed where the coupler acts as the bus without other couplers. RFI dust caps (with or without safety chains) are recommended for all unused stub ports. Data bus couplers are readily available in 2 through 8 stubs and in various sizes and shapes of boxes and slim inline models. Also, a variety of connectors are offered with couplers.
