= MIL-W-46374 =

US military watch specification

MIL-W-46374 is a specification first published on October 30, 1964, for US military watches. The 46374 was specified as an accurate, disposable watch. In its span, it encompassed metal and plastic cased watches with both mechanical and quartz movements. The 46374 replaced the MIL-W-3818, reducing cost and inheriting the dial from the MIL-W-3818B. These were lower quality watches than the 15 jewel movements, the transition started as US involvement in Vietnam ramped up.

Revision A was released in 1968. Regarding Revision B from 1976, it "added radiation symbols to the dial, indicating that the luminous markers were radioactive, H3 for tritium. Revision D (1986) expanded the scope of the specification to encompass a wider range of watches."

Pilots, divers, and other specialties continue to have military watches available for issue.

== Dial font ==
In 1957 the DOD released MIL-C-18012A, a specification detailing the legibility of numerical displays for aircraft dials and readouts, and updated it with MIL-C-18012B in 1964. At the same time as 18012B was released, so was 46374. The font 46374 inherited from W3818B is unique, "It borrows elements from the super legible Futura and Gothic style fonts of the day but it is mostly influenced by the numerical font shown in MIL-C-18012A (This font itself borrowed heavily from the Grotesk fonts of the 1920s - later known as the German DIN fonts of the 1970s). Look particularly at the flat-topped "3" and the simple geometric shapes of the other numbers. Although the numbers used on the watches (both MIL-W-46374 and the earlier MIL-W-3818B) are more rounded and bolder, the only significant departure the watch designers seem to have taken is with the "9" and "6" which have rounded and more curved tails." Uncluttered, legible dial designs like the Waltham A-13, and the Chelsea Army Message Center Clock (Mark I) inspired the US Army’s Frankford Arsenal in Philadelphia who created the dial specifications and designs, and "The minute hand in the Mark I Chelsea seems to have lent a strong influence to the hand designs used in MIL-W-3818B watches."

== Revisions ==
=== A ===
- September 1968
- Manufactured by: Benrus, Hamilton, Westclox
- Case Materials: Stainless Steel, Corrosion resistant steel, Plastic

=== B ===
- May 7, 1975
- Tritium luminous paint on the dial and hands
- Acrylic crystal
- 7 jewels
- Nylon strap with black anodized steel buckle
- Only US military watch produced by Timex
- Hamilton
- Stocker and Yale 184
- Marathon 359
- First to have "Dispose Rad. Waste" on caseback
- Clear coating on luminous painted hands to prevent the luminous paint from flaking off
- Watchband bars required to be integral or fixed, and excluded springbars
- Only Timex made B type watches with a plastic case
- Type II MIL-S-46383B strap

=== C ===
- April 15, 1983
- Larger plastic case
- Manufactured by Stocker AND Yale (S and Y, SandY)
- Quote: "The most significant changes in the new spec were a tightening of the standards for magnetism, vibration, and water resistance and some refinements to the "Dark Viewing" requirement."

=== D ===
- October 10, 1986
- Type 1: 15 jewels, plastic case, first 46374 to be maintainable, accuracy +-30 seconds a day
- Type 2: usu. 7 jewels, usu. plastic case accuracy +- 60 seconds a day
- First 46374 with a Quartz movement, Types 3, 4, 5
- Type 3: accuracy .7 secs a day, battery installed
- Type 4: As Type 3, battery in box
- Type 5: As Type 3, battery not included
- Manufactured by Hamilton, Marathon, Stocker and Yale

=== E ===
- May 31, 1989
- Because of high radiation emission from painted tritium luminous, the luminous was replaced with hermetically sealed tritium vials surrounding the outside of the dial, and on the hands
- New dial with serif style font
- Quote: "In addition to the dial layout changes the "E" revision calls for interchangeability of all parts on Type I watches on the same model from the same maker. The requirement of less than 25 milliCuries of radioactive emission from the watch face was also added to this specification."

=== F ===
- October 1991
- Added the Type 6 quartz Navigator for pilots with a function allowing the easy synchronization of multiple watches, and a rotating bezel.
- Stocker & Yale 650, 660
- Marathon 211
- Type I - Analog, short life (2 years), non-maintainable, antimagnetic, water-resistant
- Type II - Analog, long life (5–10 years), maintainable, antimagnetic, water-resistant, high altitude, corrosion-resistant
- Type III - Analog, long life (5–10 years), maintainable, antimagnetic, water-resistant, high altitude, corrosion-resistant, with elapsed time ring
- 1.2.2 Classes. The classes of wrist watches follow: Class 1 - Electrical movement, battery installed
- Class 2 - Electrical movement, battery out of watch but packed with watch
- Class 3 - Electrical movement, battery not included with watch
- Class 4 - Mechanical movement, battery not required

=== G ===
- November 12, 1999
- renamed to MIL-PRF-46374

== See also ==
- US Military Watches
- Pilot watch – Wristwatch designed for use by aircraft pilots
- Trench watch – Early wristwatch design used in World War I
- Military watches – Wristwatch designed for military use
- Mission timer – Clock for measuring time duration
- List of 24-hour watch brands
