= MIL-STD-883 =

United States defense standard

The MIL-STD-883 standard establishes uniform methods, controls, and procedures for testing microelectronic devices suitable for use within military and aerospace electronic systems including basic environmental tests to determine resistance to deleterious effects of natural elements and conditions surrounding military and space operations; mechanical and electrical tests; workmanship and training procedures; and such other controls and constraints as have been deemed necessary to ensure a uniform level of quality and reliability suitable to the intended applications of those devices. For this standard, the term "devices" includes monolithic, multichip, film and hybrid microcircuits, microcircuit arrays, and the elements from which the circuits and arrays are formed. This standard is intended to apply only to microelectronic devices.

The process of qualifying devices to this standard are conducted using both nondestructive testing and destructive testing. For tests that would destroy or damage the component a representative number from a batch are tested to indicate the performance of other devices from the same batch. Tests are also carried out during the manufacturing process. Due to the testing requirements it is not possible to retrospectively qualify devices to the full MIL-STD-883 standard once they have been released by the manufacturer.

The standard was issued by the Department of Defense, US.

== Environmental tests, methods 1001-1034 ==
- 1001 Barometric pressure, reduced (altitude operation)
- 1002 Immersion
- 1003 Insulation resistance
- 1004.7 Moisture resistance
- 1005.8 Steady-state life
- 1006 Intermittent life
- 1007 Agree life
- 1008.2 Stabilization bake
- 1009.8 Salt atmosphere
- 1010.8 Temperature cycling
- 1011.9 Thermal shock
- 1012.1 Thermal characteristics
- 1013 Dew point
- 1014.13 Seal
- 1015.10 Burn-in test
- 1016.2 Life/reliability characterization tests
- 1017.2 Neutron irradiation
- 1018.6 Internal gas analysis
- 1019.8 Ionizing radiation (total dose) test procedure
- 1020.1 Dose rate induced latchup test procedure
- 1021.3 Dose rate upset testing of digital microcircuits
- 1022 Mosfet threshold voltage
- 1023.3 Dose rate response of linear microcircuits
- 1030.2 Preseal burn-in
- 1031 Thin film corrosion test
- 1032.1 Package induced soft error test procedure
- 1033 Endurance life test
- 1034.1 Dye penetrant test

== Mechanical tests, methods 2001-2036 ==
- 2001.2 Constant acceleration
- 2002.3 Mechanical shock
- 2003.7 Solderability
- 2004.5 Lead integrity
- 2005.2 Vibration fatigue
- 2006.1 Vibration noise
- 2007.2 Vibration, variable frequency
- 2008.1 Visual and mechanical
- 2009.9 External visual
- 2010.10 Internal visual (monolithic)
- 2011.7 Bond strength (bond pull test)
- 2012.7 Radiography
- 2013.1 Internal visual inspection for DPA
- 2014 Internal visual and mechanical
- 2015.14 Resistance to solvents
- 2016 Physical dimensions
- 2017.7 Internal visual (hybrid)
- 2018.3 Scanning electron microscope (SEM) inspection of metallization
- 2019.5 Die shear strength
- 2020.7 Particle impact noise detection test (PIND)
- 2021.3 Glassivation layer integrity
- 2022.2 Wetting balance solderability
- 2023.5 Nondestructive bond pull
- 2024.2 Lid torque for glass-frit-sealed packages
- 2025.4 Adhesion of lead finish
- 2026 Random vibration
- 2027.2 Substrate attach strength
- 2028.4 Pin grid package destructive lead pull test
- 2029 Ceramic chip carrier bond strength
- 2030 Ultrasonic inspection of die attach
- 2031.1 Flip chip pull-off test
- 2032.1 Visual inspection of passive elements
- 2035 Ultrasonic inspection of TAB bonds
- 2036 Resistance to soldering heat

== Electrical tests (digital), methods 3001-3024 ==
- 3001.1 Drive source, dynamic
- 3002.1 Load conditions
- 3003.1 Delay measurements
- 3004.1 Transition time measurements
- 3005.1 Power supply current
- 3006.1 High level output voltage
- 3007.1 Low level output voltage
- 3008.1 Breakdown voltage, input or output
- 3009.1 Input current, low level
- 3010.1 Input current, high level
- 3011.1 Output short circuit current
- 3012.1 Terminal capacitance
- 3013.1 Noise margin measurements for digital microelectronic devices
- 3014 Functional testing
- 3015.8 Electrostatic discharge sensitivity classification
- 3016 Activation time verification
- 3017 Microelectronics package digital signal transmission
- 3018 Crosstalk measurements for digital microelectronic device packages
- 3019.1 Ground and power supply impedance measurements for digital microelectronics device packages
- 3020 High impedance (off-state) low-level output leakage current
- 3021 High impedance (off-state) high-level output leakage current
- 3022 Input clamp voltage
- 3023.1 Static latch-up measurements for digital CMOS microelectronic devices
- 3024 Simultaneous switching noise measurements for digital microelectronic devices

== Electrical tests (linear), methods 4001-4007 ==
- 4001.1 Input offset voltage and current and bias current
- 4002.1 Phase margin and slew rate measurements
- 4003.1 Common mode input voltage range, Common mode rejection ratio, Supply voltage rejection ratio
- 4004.2 Open loop performance
- 4005.1 Output performance
- 4006.1 Power gain and noise figure
- 4007 Automatic gain control range

== Test procedures, methods 5001-5013 ==
- 5001 Parameter mean value control
- 5002.1 Parameter distribution control
- 5003 Failure analysis procedures for microcircuits
- 5004.11 Screening procedures
- 5005.15 Qualification and quality conformance procedures
- 5006 Limit testing
- 5007.7 Wafer lot acceptance
- 5008.9 Test procedures for hybrid and multichip microcircuits
- 5009.1 Destructive physical analysis
- 5010.4 Test procedures for custom monolithic microcircuits
- 5011.5 Evaluation and acceptance procedures for polymeric adhesives
- 5012.1 Fault coverage measurement for digital microcircuits
- 5013 Wafer fabrication control and wafer acceptance procedures for processed GaAs wafers
