= Pull off test =

A pull-off test, also called stud pull test, is a type of test in which an adhesive connection is made between a stud and a carrier (or object to be tested) by using a glue, possibly an epoxy or polyester resin, that is stronger than the bond that needs to be tested. The force required to pull the stud from the surface, together with the carrier, is measured. Simple mechanical hand-operated loading equipment has been developed for this purpose. When higher accuracy is required, tests can be performed with more advanced equipment called a bond tester. A bond tester provides more control and possibly automation. Applying the glue automatically and curing with UV light is the next step in automation. This methodology can also be used to measure direct tensile strength or/and the bond strength between two different layers.

MIL-STD-883 methods 2011.9 destructive bond pull test and 2031.1 flip chip pull off test apply, as well as JEDEC JESD22-B109.

Partial coring may be used, if necessary, to eliminate surface skin effects.
