= MIL-STD-704 =

United States military standard for aircraft power interfaces

MIL-STD-704 Aircraft Electrical Power Characteristics is a United States Military Standard that defines a standardized power interface between a military aircraft and its equipment and carriage stores, covering such topics as voltage, frequency, phase, power factor, ripple, maximum current, electrical noise and abnormal conditions (overvoltage and undervoltage), for both AC and DC systems.

MIL-HDBK-704 is a handbook that provides guidance on test procedures for demonstration of utilization equipment to determine compliance with the aircraft electrical power characteristics of MIL-STD-704, revisions A through F. MIL-HDBK-704 is divided into 8 parts. Part 1 provides general guidance information on compliance tests, power groups, aircraft electrical operating conditions, and utilization equipment specifications. Parts 2 through Part 8 provide guidance on application of compliance tests for utilization equipment in specific power groups.

== Electrical system ==
The standard defines the basic aircraft AC system at 115/200 volts, 400 Hz (the larger figure indicating three-phase power). Variable frequency systems are allowed to switch between 360 and 800 Hz. Double voltage systems use the same frequency at 230/400 volts. Secondary power systems can be variable frequency or double voltage; they can also use 115 volts, 60 Hz to run commercial off-the-shelf products expecting mains electricity.

The DC system runs at 28 volts or 270 volts.
