= NATO Standardization Office =

NATO agency responsible for standardization activities

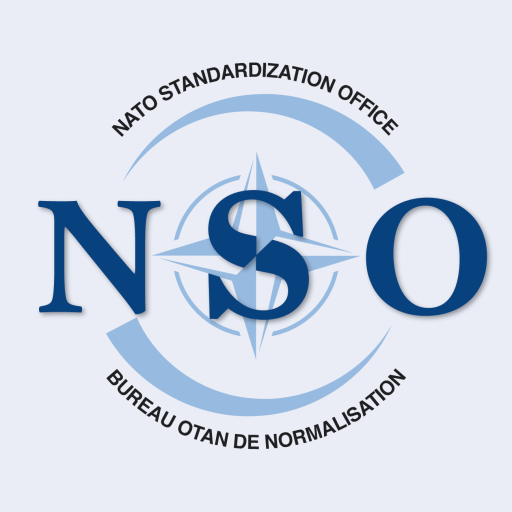
- Logo
- Abbreviation: NSO
- Predecessor: Military Standardization Agency (MSA); Military Agency for Standardization (MAS); Office for NATO Standardization (ONS); NATO Standardization Agency (NSA)
- Formation: 1950 (MSA)
- Type: Military alliance
- Purpose: Military standardization
- Headquarters: Brussels, Belgium
- Coordinates: 50°52′34.16″N 4°25′19.24″E
- Official language: English, French
- Director (DNSO): Thierry Poulette
- Parent organization: NATO
- Website: nso.nato.int/nso/

The NATO Standardization Office (NSO) (former NATO Standardization Agency, NSA; French: Bureau OTAN de normalisation) is a NATO entity created in 1950 to support Allies in standardization activities. The NSA was formed through the merger of the Military Agency for Standardization and the Office for NATO Standardization. During the Agency Reforms, the NSA was transformed to the NATO Standardization Office (NSO) on 1 July 2014, headed by the Director of the NATO Standardization Office (DNSO).

The role of the NSO is to initiate, coordinate, support and administer standardization activities conducted under the authority of the Committee for Standardization. The NSO also assists NATO's Military Committee in developing military operational standards. These activities foster NATO standardization with the goal of enhancing the interoperability and operational effectiveness of Alliance military forces.

NSO headquarters is located at the main NATO headquarters at Boulevard Léopold III, B-1110 Brussels.

== History ==
On October 24, 1950, during the fourth meeting of the Military Committee, arose the first instance of there being a need for a standardization body. The first NATO standardization agency, the Military Standardization Agency (MSA), held its first meeting on January 15, 1951, in London, changing its name to the Military Agency for Standardization (MAS) (it was later chartered on January 30). In November 1970, the agency was moved to its current location in Brussels, Belgium, which is also the location of NATO headquarters.

A proposal was submitted in 1991 to create the NATO Standardization Agency however it was not created. Instead, a standardization agency for civilian staff was created, the Office for NATO Standardization (ONS). The ONS was established in 1994 and later implemented in 1995 by the North Atlantic Council. In 2001, NATO formally merged the two agencies, the MAS and the ONS, together and renamed it to the NATO Standardization Agency, which served both the military and civilian staff.

On 1 July 2014 the NATO Standardization Agency (NSA) became the NATO Standardization Office (NSO) as it was integrated into the International Military Staff (IMS) of NATO.

== Structure ==
Former NSA logo

As an integrated part of NATO Headquarters, the NSO works under the governance of the Committee for Standardization (CS) and the Military Committee (MC) which are both under the authority of the North Atlantic Council. The NSO is divided into six branches: Air, Army, Naval and Joint, as well as the Policy and Coordination branch and the Standardization Support Branch.

The Director of the NATO Standardization Organization (DNSO) is the head authority figure of the NSO. The DNSO serves as the primary standardization advisor to the Military Committee and to the Secretary General of NATO. The Director is selected by the CS after an endorsement from the Military Committee. The Secretary General then formally appoints the DNSO for (normally) a three-year term. The Secretary General of NATO appointed former MAS director rear admiral Jan H. Eriksen as the first DNSA on October 1, 2001. The current Director of the NATO Standardization Office is Major General Thierry Poulette.

=== List of DNSAs and DNSOs ===
DNSA	Term		Nationality	Ref
Rear Adm. Jan H. Eriksen	October 1, 2001	August 30, 2003	(Norway) Norwegian	
Maj. Gen. Julian Maj	September 1, 2003	June 30, 2007	(Poland) Polish	
Vice Adm. Juan A. Moreno	July 1, 2007	June 30, 2010	(Spain) Spanish	
Dr. Cihangir Akşit	July 1, 2010	June 30, 2014	(Turkey) Turkish	
Maj. Gen. Edvardas Mažeikis	July 1, 2014	February 28, 2018	(Lithuania) Lithuanian	
Brig. Gen. Gulyás Zoltán	March 1, 2018	June 23, 2021	(Hungary) Hungarian	
Maj. Gen. Dimitrios Sigoulakis	June 24, 2021	June 30, 2024	(Greece) Greek	
Maj. Gen. Thierry Poulette	July 1, 2024	Present	(France) French	

== NATO Standards ==
A standard is a formalized set of guidelines and specifications developed to ensure that materials, products, processes, and services meet consistent and reliable criteria. It serves as a common framework, created through a consensus process involving experts and stakeholders, to facilitate uniformity, interoperability, and safety.

Early in the establishment of NATO, the need for common standards for equipment and modes of operation was established. The civil standards developed elsewhere did not always match the requirements and needs of the military alliance. As described in this article, the MAS and later NSO was therefore established to support the member nations to develop so called NATO standards.

The NATO standard is often divided into three areas, namely the material, operational and administrative. As the names suggest, standardization can vary from armaments to military doctrine and terminology. Once implemented, a Standard allows members of the alliance, and partners, to cooperate with increased interoperability – the ultimate goal of NATO standardization.[13]

== Standardization Agreements ==
NATO Standards are associated with what are known as Standardization Agreement (STANAG)s. A (STANAG) is a document that specifies the agreement between NATO nations to implement a standard. Once they are adopted by a nation, a STANAG allows members of the alliance to cooperate with that nation. The DNSO is who has the authority to promulgate a STANAG or an Allied Publication (AP). The NSO publishes STANAGs in a database in English and French on their website. This is a partial list of STANAGs with related articles:

STANAG	Details
STANAG 1059	Edition 8, 19 February 2004: National Distinguishing Letters for Use by NATO Armed Forces.
STANAG 2961	Classes of Supply of NATO Land Forces.
STANAG 2970	Aerial Recovery Equipment and Techniques for Helicopters
STANAG 3150	Uniform System of Supply Classification.
STANAG 3151	Uniform System of Item of Supply Identification.
STANAG 3350	Analogue Video Standard for Aircraft System Applications.
STANAG 3910	1Mbit/sec MIL-STD-1553B data bus augmented by a 20 Mbit/s, Optical or Electrical, High Speed (HS) channel. Optical version implemented (as EFAbus) on the Eurofighter Typhoon (EF2000)) and electrical (as EN 3910) on Dassault Rafale. Replaced by EN 3910.
STANAG 4082	Edition 2, 28 May 1969: Adoption of a Standard Artillery Computer Meteorological Message (METCM).
STANAG 4140	Edition 2, 28 May 2001: Adoption of a Standard Target Acquisition Meteorological Message (METTA).
STANAG 4119	Edition 2, 5 February 2007: Adoption of a Standard Cannon Artillery Firing Table Format.
STANAG 4179	Draft STANAG proposed in 1980 about a type of detachable firearm magazine.
STANAG 4355	Edition 3, 17 April 2009: Modified Point Mass Trajectory Model.
STANAG 4569	Protection levels for Occupants of Logistic and Light Armoured Vehicles.
STANAG 4586	Standard Interface of the Unmanned Control System (UCS) for NATO UAV interoperability.
STANAG 4626	Modular and Open Avionics Architectures - Part I - Architecture.
STANAG 4694	NATO Accessory Rail.
STANAG 5066	The adoption of a Profile for HF Data Communications, supporting Selective Repeat ARQ error control, HF E-Mail and IP-over-HF operation.
STANAG 5602	Standard Interface for Military Platform Link Evaluation (SIMPLE), a Tactical Data Link (TDL) protocol.
STANAG 6022	Edition 2, 22 March 2010: Adoption of a Standard Gridded Data Meteorological Message (METGM).
STANAG 7074	Digital Geographic Exchange Standard (DIGEST).

== See also ==
- Structure of NATO
- Standardization Agreement
