= Akşit =

Akşit is a Turkish surname. Notable people with the surname include:

- Baha Akşit (1914–1995), Turkish physician
- Cihangir Akşit, Turkish major general and NATO official
- Güldal Akşit (born 1960), Turkish politician
