= Standardization (disambiguation) =

Standardization or standardisation is the process of implementing and developing technical standards.

The term also has other senses:

- Standard score, in statistics, the number of standard deviations by which an observation differs from the mean
- Standard language, a language variety whose grammar and usage are codified
- Standardization of population numbers in demographics
- Standardization agreement, defining processes, procedures, terms, and conditions for common military or technical procedures or equipment between the member countries of the NATO alliance
