= Military rank correspondence system =

A military rank correspondence system is a comparison of military ranks across different countries based on their command levels and equivalents, facilitating understanding of hierarchy and functions. This system helps compare ranks across the Army, Air Force, and other branches of the military, but is not always complete, as each country and branch has its own unique characteristics and historical roots. NATO codes according to the STANAG 2116 are often used for this system. However, this comparison has several drawbacks, as for some ranks, such codes simply do not exist or their use is controversial.

In most countries, military ranks are divided into army ranks (awarded to members of the Army and Air Force) and naval ranks (awarded to members of the Navy). However, some countries may have separate rank systems for the Air Force and/or other specific branches of the military (forces), which can complicate comparisons.

This article examines the general issues associated with the creation of a unified military rank correspondence system, including one based on the STANAG 2116.

== Rank coding systems according to Veremeev and Kramnik ==
Ukrainian military expert Lieutenant Colonel Yuri Veremeev and co-author of his works on the navy, Ilya Kramnik, proposed the following military rank coding systems to eliminate errors in comparing military ranks:

Army Rank Coding System (according to Veremeev)
Code	Position
0	Recruit, Untrained Soldier
1	Trained Soldier (rifleman, driver, machine gunner, etc.)
2	Group Commander, Assistant Squad Leader
3	Squad Leader
4	Deputy Platoon Commander
5	Company or Battalion Sergeant Major
6	Warrant Officers (praporshik in the Russian Army)
7	Platoon Commander
8	Deputy Company Commander, Separate Platoon Commander
9	Company Commander
10	Deputy Battalion Commander
11	Battalion Commander, Deputy Regiment Commander
12	Regiment Commander, Deputy Brigade Commander, Deputy Division Commander
13	Brigade Commander
14	Division Commander, Deputy Corps Commander
15	Corps Commander, Deputy Army Commander
16	Army Commander, Deputy Commander District (Army Group)
17	District (Front, Army Group) Commander
18	Commander-in-Chief, Commander of the Armed Forces, honorary titles

Naval Rank Coding System (according to Kramnik)
Code	Position
0	Untrained Seaman
1	Specialized Seaman (helmsman-signalman, radio technician, etc.)
2	Team leader, assistant squad leader
3	Section leader
4	Deputy platoon (combat post) commander, boatswain on a ship of 4th rank
5	Chief petty officer of the combat unit (company) on a ship of 2nd-1st rank, boatswain on a ship of 3rd-2nd rank
6	Commander of the combat post (platoon) (in wartime), chief boatswain on a ship of 2nd-1st rank
7	Commander of the combat post (platoon)
8	Deputy commander of the combat unit (company) on a ship of 2nd-1st rank, senior assistant of the ship's commander of 4th rank
9	Commander of the combat unit (company) on a ship of 2nd rank and above, ship's commander of 4th rank, senior assistant of the ship's commander of 3rd rank
10	Ship's commander of 3rd rank, senior assistant of the ship's commander of 2nd rank
11	Ship's commander of 2nd rank, senior assistant of the ship's commander of 1st rank, commander 4th rank ship detachment
12	1st rank ship commander, 3rd rank ship detachment commander, deputy commander of a 2nd-1st rank ship brigade
13	2nd-1st rank ship brigade commander, deputy squadron (division) commander
14	Squadron (division) commander, deputy flotilla or operational squadron (army) commander
15	Flotilla or operational squadron (army) commander, deputy fleet commander
16	Fleet commander, Chief of the General Staff of the Navy, Deputy Commander-in-Chief of the Navy
17	Commander-in-Chief of the Navy

This system allowed for the addition of letters to numerical codes. For example, if code 2 in the Russian army corresponded to the rank of gefreiter, then in the Wehrmacht, which had several corporal ranks, these ranks could be coded as follows:

- 2a - Gefreiter
- 2b - Obergefreiter
- 2c - Stabsgefreiter

Although the military rank coding systems of Veremeyev and Kramnik have their obvious advantages, as they offer objective criteria for comparison, they were not widely used outside the "Anatomy of the Army" website for objective reasons, in particular:

- the systems were based on the Soviet-Russian system of military ranks and did not take into account the traditions of other countries (Note: For example, in the British Army, a company commander is a major, and a captain is the deputy company commander. According to Veremeyev's rank coding system, British majors and captains were one rank lower than similar ranks in other armies, which is nonsense: in NATO, according to STANAG 2116, they are considered equal to similar ranks in other armies.)
- the death of Yuri Veremeev before the reform of military ranks in Ukraine, when new sergeant and senior ranks and corresponding new positions were introduced in order to bring the Ukrainian Armed Forces into line with NATO standards

== Rank coding system according to STANAG 2116 ==
=== General information on STANAG 2116 rank codes ===
The current 7th edition of STANAG 2116, released in January 2021, is only the introductory section in English and French. The essence of the standard is set out in NATO standard APersP-01 Ed. A, which "details the NATO military codes for use by countries in preparing personnel tables, applications, reports, and declarations for NATO organizations and commands." The standard also notes that nothing in it should interfere with existing national rank designations or procedures in purely national institutions.

According to the introductory section, the standard divides NATO military code groups into officer ranks (OF) and other ranks (OR):

- General officer – OF-6 to OF-10
- Senior officer – OF-3 to OF-5
- Junior officer – OF-1 to OF-2
- Other ranks – OR-1 to OR-9

The current version of APersP-01 Ed. A contains the introductory section and six annexes:

- A – army officer ranks
- B – naval officer ranks
- C – air force officer ranks
- D – other army ranks
- E – other naval ranks
- F – other air force ranks

Each annex consists of a comparison table and comments from a NATO country with its own unique characteristics.

The numbering in the system generally corresponds to the United States Military Pay Grading System, with E-x replaced by OR-x. The main difference lies in the career officer rank system, where the US system defines two ranks at the OF-1 level (O-1 and O-2), meaning that all O-x numbers after O-1 are one level higher on the US scale (for example, a major is an OF-3 on the NATO scale and an O-4 on the US scale).

=== National peculiarities of using STANAG 2116 codes ===
The criteria for comparing ranks are command and other relevant positions and their position in the hierarchy of military formations.

OF-10 is usually an honorary rank, not found in all NATO countries, and is usually awarded during wartime

The US Armed Forces Warrant Officers have their own code group, but the description of these codes has been amended:

- in Annex A of STANAG 2116 (Ed. 4), the US notes listed the code group W1 - W4 and indicated that this is a separate and distinct category of armed forces personnel, whose rank and priority are below OF, but above OR, and therefore cannot be included in these groups
- in STANAG 2116 (Ed. 5), this note remained, but for some reason, the introductory section of the standard listed codes WO1 - 4
- in STANAG 2116 (Ed. 6), the notes regarding codes W1 - W5 were moved to the introductory section of the standard
- in the current version of the standard, a similar note is contained only in the notes to Appendices A, B, and C, and this category of military personnel is called Officers

== SWO Military Rank/Grade Code System ==
SWO Military Rank/Grade Code System (V. 1.8, in Ukrainian, title page)

SWO Military Rank/Grade Code System (V. 1.8 LE, page 5)

In January 2026, Ukrainian scientist Yurii Kharabuha published version 1.0 of the SWO Military Rank/Grade Code System. The name SWO is an abbreviation of the first letters of the ranks: S (soldier/seaman/sergeant/starshina), W (warrant officer), O (officer). This development is based on the STANAG 2116 military rank codes, adapted for use in online encyclopedias for comparing military ranks of the 20th and 21st centuries:

- Officer (Of) and warrant officer (W) ranks are supplemented with the Of0 rank for officer candidates and W0 for warrant officer candidates, non-officer (S) ranks are supplemented with the S0 rank for recruits and the S10 rank for SEA with general officers (major general, lieutenant general etc.)
- Of and S ranks use the indices "+" (senior rank) and "-" (junior rank) to clarify rank
- for cases where the indices "+" and "–" are not enough, the index "++" was additionally introduced in version 1.4
- officer ranks (Of) are fully oriented to the OF codes of the STANAG 2116 standard, which are specified using the indices "+", "–" and "++":
  - the code Of10 is used for ranks of the field marshal level, which in STANAG 2116 have the code OF-10
  - the code Of10+ is used only for unique military ranks of the generalissimo level, which are clearly higher than the field marshal level and are absent in STANAG 2116
  - the code Of10– is used for military ranks that generally meet the criteria of the code Of10, but due to a relatively high frequency of assignment or for other national reasons deserve the code Of10–
  - for codes from Of9 to Of2 the following criteria are used:
    - commander-in-chief of the armed forces (OF-9) ― code Of9++
    - commander-in-chief of land forces/navy/air force (OF-9) ― code Of9+
    - army group commander (OF-9) or equivalent position ― code Of9
    - field army commander (OF-9) ― code Of9−
    - corps commander (OF-8) ― code Of8
    - division commander (OF-7) ― code Of7
    - brigade commander (OF-6) ― code Of6
    - regiment commander (OF-5) ― code Of5
    - battalion commander (OF-4) ― code Of4
    - staff officer (OF-3) ― code Of3
    - company commander (OF-2) ― code Of2
  - index «+» (senior rank) is used when at the same numerical rank an officer has a higher position, for example, is an army commander at the rank of OF-8
  - index «–» (junior rank) is used when at the same numerical rank an officer has a position characteristic of a younger rank, or for other national reasons
  - code Of1 is assigned to the basic rank OF-1, which corresponds to the rank assigned to a graduate of a military academy
  - code Of1+ is the senior rank OF-1, and code Of1− is a rank that for certain reasons is a younger rank OF-1 (Note: A typical example of Of1− is the rank of junior lieutenant, which in the Soviet Army was awarded to graduates of secondary specialized educational institutions, and in wartime to graduates of accelerated officer training courses)
- for non-officer ranks (S) there may be some offset relative to the OR code of the STANAG 2116 standard, due to the following reasons:
  - In the US Army, the OR-4 code is assigned to two ranks of different nature (specialist as the senior rank for enlisted personnel and corporal as the junior rank for non-commissioned officers), therefore the OR-4 code is divided into S4 for a corporal and S3 for a specialist, due to which all junior ranks in the US Army are offset by 1, namely: OR-3 = S2, OR-2 = S1, OR-1 = S0
  - Since the US Marine Corps does not have this problem, only the OR-1 rank becomes S0; the remaining USMC ranks, except S10, remain unchanged numerically: only the letter designation changes from OR to S
- the S10 rank, which has no equivalent in STANAG 2116, contains the following three subranks: S10− for SEA assigned to generals (division/corps/operational command SEA, FORCM/FLTCM etc.), S10 for SEA assigned to the commander of a branch of service, and S10+ for SEAC

To enable the SWO system to be used in comparative tables, as well as to allow comparison of police and other special ranks with military ranks, version 1.8 introduces a simplified code system (SWO+). The criteria for applying codes and indexes in the SWO+ system will be discussed in more detail in version 1.9, scheduled for release in Ukrainian, Russian, and English in the fall of 2026.

== See also ==
- List of comparative military ranks
- NATO military rank codes

== Bibliography ==
- Yurii Kharabuha (August 5, 2026). SWO: Military Rank/Grade Code System (version 1.8, updatable) (PDF) (in Ukrainian). Lviv, Ukraine.
- Yurii Kharabuha (August 5, 2026). SWO: Military Rank/Grade Code System (version 1.8, updatable) (PDF) (in Russian). Lviv, Ukraine.
- APersP-01: NATO Codes for Grades of Military Personnel (Ed. A, Ver. 3). Brussels, Belgium: NATO Standardization Office. 16 June 2022.
- STANAG 2116: NATO Codes for Grades of Military Personnel (Ed. 7). Brussels, Belgium: NATO Standardization Office. 13 January 2021.
- STANAG 2116: NATO Codes for Grades of Military Personnel (Ed. 6). Brussels, Belgium: NATO Standardization Agensy. 25 February 2010.
- STANAG 2116: NATO Codes for Grades of Military Personnel (Ed. 5) (PDF). Brussels, Belgium: Military Standardization Agency. 13 March 1996. Archived (PDF) from the original on 2024-03-13.
- "Annex 3A: NATO Codes for Grades of Military Personnel – STANAG 2116 (Ed. 4)". BRd 2: The Queen's regulations for the Royal Navy (Ver. 6) (PDF). Fareham, England: Navy Publications and Graphics Organisation. April 2017. pp. 3A-1 – 3A-13 (60 – 72).
- "Annex B: Comparative Formation/Unit Designations". APP-06: NATO Joint Military Symbology (Ed. E, Ver. 1). Brussels, Belgium: NATO Standardization Office. 11 October 2023. pp. 795 – 826 (829 – 860).
