= STANAG 6022 =

NATO standardization agreement

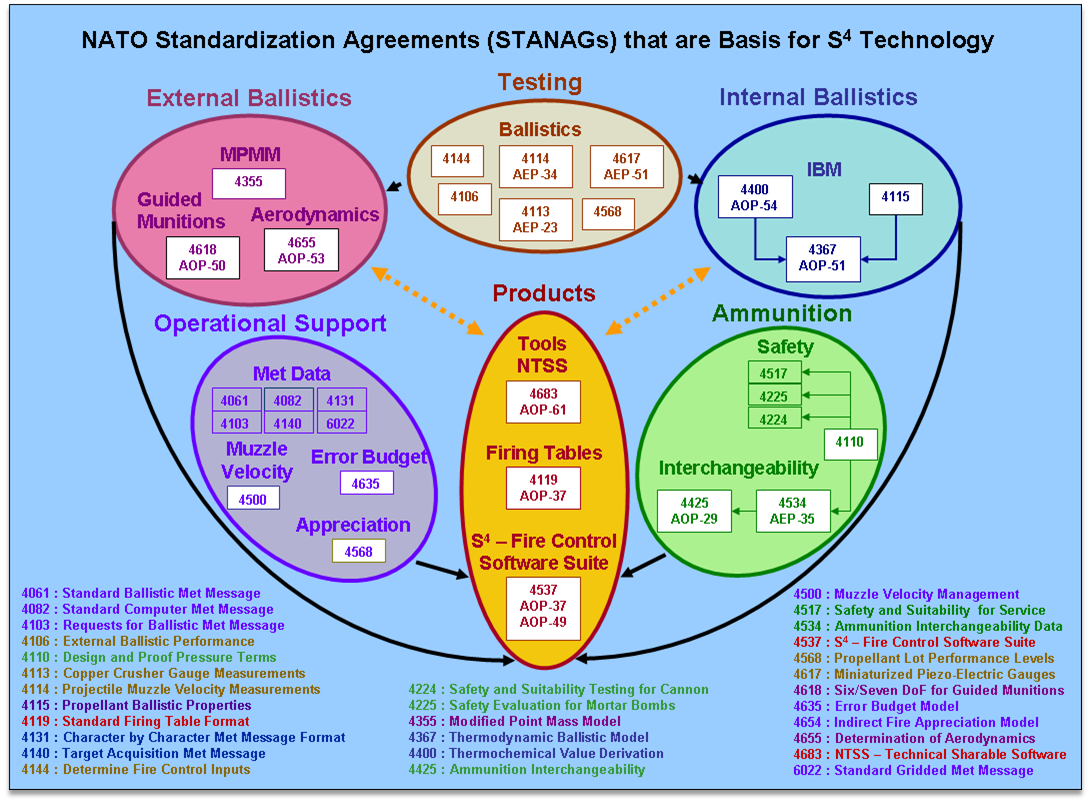

STANAG 6022 – Adoption of a Standard Gridded Data Meteorological Message is a NATO Standardization Agreement for gridded meteorological data for operational use in Artillery fire control systems, NBC Automated Warning, Reporting and Prediction Systems (NBC AWRAPS), and various computer-based Battlefield (or Tactical) Decision Aids (BDAs). The message format is referred to as METGM.

== Utility ==
STANAG 6022 is the latest step in artillery meteorological messaging, which provides for gridded meteorological data. This means that instead of using a single Radiosonde ascent capturing local data over a short time period, and circulating that information using older formats, such as the Standard Computer Meteorological message (METCM) under STANAG 4082, it provides a grid of data in four dimensions – vertical, two horizontal and time. The METGM is compiled from many data sources in Weather Analysis Centres (WACs). The data is no longer directly human readable in ASCII text, like METCM was, and thus it can not be distributed by voice. Data communications are used transfer the METGM to a fire control computer. A METGM approach can thus reduce or remove the need for local data acquisition for some communities.

The format allows meteorological data to be published for a grid of any defined size / resolution containing only those parameters specifically requested by users. Thus, it can be used to pass data sets varying from coarse resolution, single-parameter data through to very high resolution, multi-parameter data depending upon specific data requirements and communications capabilities.

The area of coverage for Artillery usage can be scaled based on the mobility of the underlying forces and the range of the howitzers. A particular benefit of this approach is that it provides data that is more representative of the wider meteorological conditions and appropriate data will be used along the trajectory as range is increasing in modern artillery weapon platforms. Products within the NATO Armaments Meteorological Kernel (NAMK) project under the SG2 Shareable (Fire Control) Software Suite (S4) can be used to process compliant METGM messages.

It can also potentially be used, instead of Standard Target Acquisition Meteorological message (METTA) under STANAG 4140, with Sound ranging systems or in support of Chemical Biological, Radiological and Nuclear calculations for downwind hazards and plume prediction by tools such as the Joint Effects Model (JEM).

== Custodianship and edition ==
The custodian of this STANAG is MILMET, formerly BMWG, within NATO. The final copy was Edition 2, dated 22 March 2010. Implementation of METGM is often accomplished by adoption of components of the SG2 Shareable (Fire Control) Software Suite (S4). This STANAG was cancelled and superseded by STANAG 6015 Ed 5, which is a cover STANAG for the NATO Meteorological and Oceanographic Codes Manual (AMETOCP-4) Volume I and II, both of which were promulgated at Ed A Ver. 1 on 24 May 2019.

== Implementations ==
- NATO Armaments Meteorological Kernel (NAMK) – Met Manager (METM)
- SEDRIS tool which supports METGM
