= NATO military rank codes =

Military rank equivalents within NATO

Nato Codes for Grades of Military Personnel
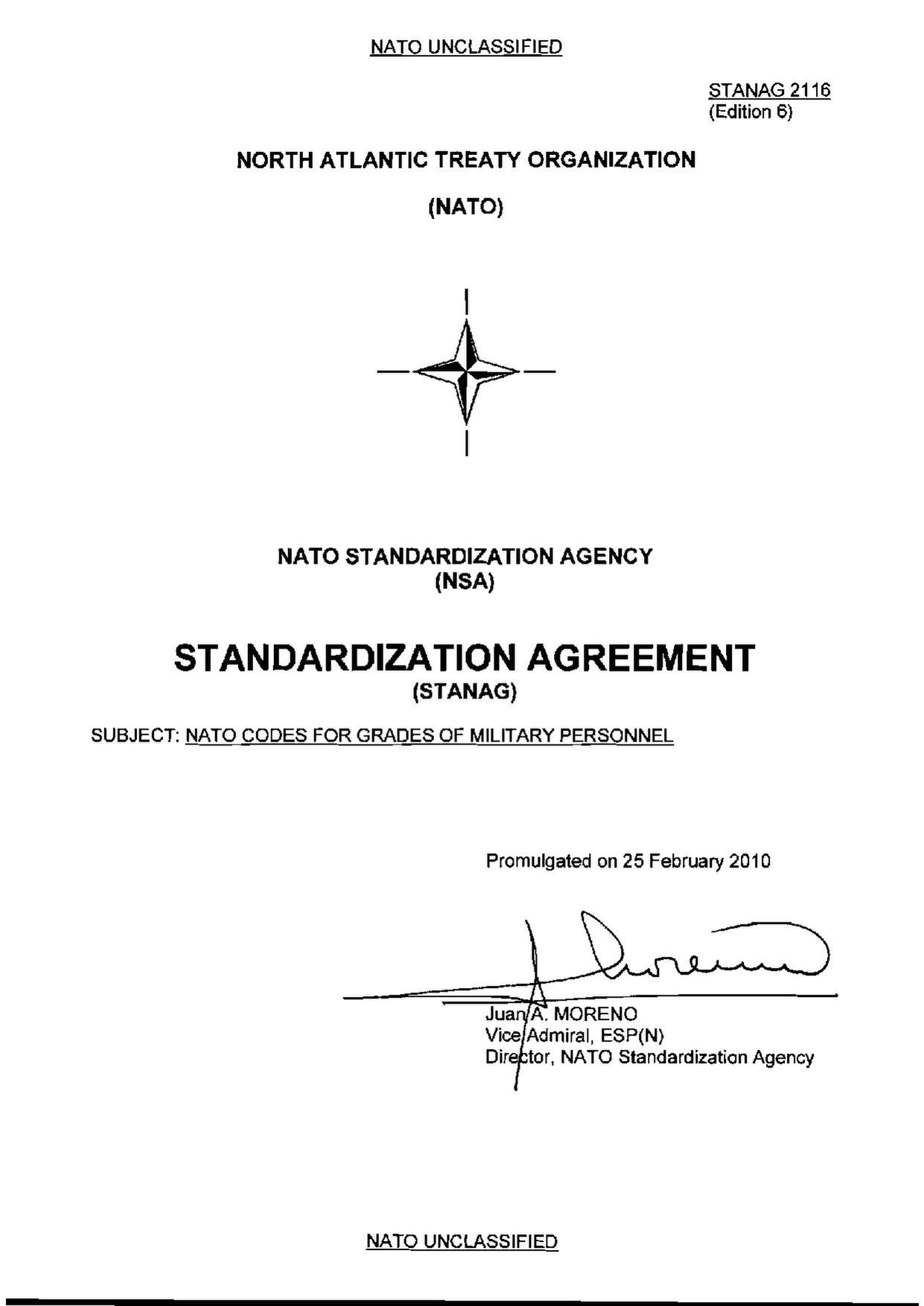
- STANAG 2116 (Edition 6), effective 25 February 2010 to 13 January 2021
- Type: NATO standard
- Signed: 16 June 2022 (current)
- Parties: NATO members

NATO military ranks use a standardized system of codes (OF for officers, OR for other ranks) to allow for comparison between member nations, though the specific names for each rank vary by country.

== Rank codes ==
NATO maintains a "standard rank scale" which is also known as a "standardized reference system" in an attempt to standardize NATO codes of rank for military personnel and indicated correspondence with nations ranks. NATO's standardized reference system is intended to be used "by nations when preparing personnel tables, requisitions, reports and returns destined for NATO nations, organizations and commands."

The NATO codes assigned for each grade are based on the agreed corresponding army grades with the naval and air forces grades determined from them by "national regulations".

The NATO rank reference code categories were established in STANAG 2116 (formally titled NATO Codes for Grades of Military Personnel). It is known for certain that STANAG 2116 was ratified by Denmark on 19 January 1971 and that the 3rd edition of STANAG 2116 was adopted no later than October 1975. The current- 7th - edition is just the cover, and the core of the standard is in set out in APersP-01 Ed. A.

Revision History
Edition/Version	Date
STANAG 2116 Ed.1	approximately 1971
STANAG 2116 Ed.2	no data
STANAG 2116 Ed.3	no later than October 1975
STANAG 2116 Ed.4	June 14, 1978
STANAG 2116 Ed.5	March 13, 1996
STANAG 2116 Ed.6	February 25, 2010
STANAG 2116 Ed.7, APersP-01 Ed.A V.1	January 13, 2021
APersP-01 Ed.A V.2	March 11, 2022
APersP-01 Ed.A V.3	June 16, 2022

=== Officers codes ===
OF-10 – OF-1 (highest to lowest rank code) are used for commissioned officers:

- OF-10 – OF-6: General officers
- OF-5 – OF-3: Senior officers
- OF-2 – OF-1: Junior officers

According to the standard, OF-10 is a national title, (Note: Marshal, Captain General etc.) so it is not found in most of the armed forces of NATO countries, including the US Armed Forces. (Note: The ranks of General of the Army, Fleet Admiral and General of the Air Force are reserved for wartime use only and designated in previous editions of STANAG 2116 as OF-10, but not listed in the current version of the standard.) For example, in the French Armed Forces OF-10 is not a rank but a title, which corresponds moreover to a high position in the state. There is no OF-10 in the British Royal Marines; (Note: Captain General Royal Marines is the title of the ceremonial head of the Royal Marines. The uniform and insignia currently worn by the Captain General are those of a Field Marshal (OF-10).) in the British Army, Royal Navy and Royal Air Force, rank OF-10 is applicable in wartime only. The armed forces of Albania, Latvia and Luxembourg also lack the OF-9 rank.

=== Other ranks codes ===
OR-9 – OR-1 (highest to lowest rank code) are used for other ranks (enlisted ranks and non-commissioned officers (NCO)):

- OR-9 – OR-5: Non-commissioned officers
- OR-4 – OR-1: Other ranks/enlisted ranks

For NATO purposes, NCOs are ranked OR-5 to OR-9. However, national rank structures might differentiate from this.

In the U.S. armed forces, warrant officer is a separate and distinct category of officers. This officer rank and precedence is below those of officer personnel, but above that of non-officer personnel, and has a special group of codes (W-1 – W-5). In the Commonwealth tradition (for NATO the British Armed Forces and Canadian Armed Forces) warrant officers are the highest other ranks.

In the British Armed Forces senior non-commissioned officers (e.g. sergeants) are in OR-5 to OR-7 and junior non-commissioned officers (e.g. corporals) are in OR-3 and OR-4. In the U.S. military OR-5 and above are non-commissioned officers for the U.S. Army and U.S. Air Force but in the U.S. Marine Corps and U.S. Navy (both parts of the Department of the Navy), OR-4 and above are non-commissioned officers.

=== Comparison to US system ===
The numbers in the system broadly correspond to the U.S. uniformed services pay grades, with OR-x replacing E-x. The main difference is in the commissioned officer ranks, where the US system recognizes two grades at OF-1 level (O-1 and O-2), meaning that all O-x numbers after O-1 are one point higher on the US scale than they are on the NATO scale (e.g. a major is OF-3 on the NATO scale and O-4 on the US scale). For warrant officers, NATO codes and U.S. uniformed services pay grades are equivalent.

Officer ranks
Rank group	General / flag officers					Senior officers			Junior officers		
NATO code	OF-10	OF-9	OF-8	OF-7	OF-6	OF-5	OF-4	OF-3	OF-2	OF-1	
Uniformed services pay grade	Special grade	O-10	O-9	O-8	O-7	O-6	O-5	O-4	O-3	O-2	O-1

Other ranks
Rank group	Non-commissioned officers						Enlisted			
NATO code	OR-9		OR-8	OR-7	OR-6	OR-5	OR-4	OR-3	OR-2	OR-1
Uniformed services pay grade	Special	E-9	E-8	E-7	E-6	E-5	E-4	E-3	E-2	E-1

== Officer rank code application ==
Annex B to APP-06 (related to STANAG 2019) standard lists 11 formation/unit groups (13 in U.S. Armed Forces from 0 to 12) and identifies the command level of some of them:

Group	Symbol	Unit	Commanding officer		
Group	Symbol	Unit	§ B.2 of APP-06	in U.S.	in UK
Group 11	☓☓☓☓☓	Army Group	joint force commander	OF-9	OF-9
Group 10	☓☓☓☓	Army (Note: the largest tactical and administrative formation of armed forces)	―	OF-8 or OF-9	OF-8
Group 9	☓☓☓	Corps	normally OF-8	OF-8	OF-8
Group 8	☓☓	Division	normally OF-7	OF-7 (Note: assisted by two principal OF-6)	OF-7
Group 7	☓	Brigade (Note: the meaning of brigade and regiment differs across armies and branch of service, and other names may be used)	normally OF-5 or OF-6	OF-5	OF-6
Group 6	❘ ❘ ❘	Regiment	usually OF-4, OF-5 or OF-6	OF-5	OF-5 or OF-4
Group 5	❘ ❘	Battalion (Note: depending on army and service arm may be known by other names)	OF-3 or OF-4	OF-4	OF-4
Group 4	❘	Company	OF-2 or OF-3	OF-2	OF-3 (Note: OF-2 is second-in-command)
Group 3 (Note: may or may not require administrative support, group 2 and group 1 requires administrative and logistical support)	●●●	Platoon	OF-1/OF-2 or OR-7/OR-8	OF-1	OF-1

== Non-officer rank code criteria ==
The Bilateral Strategic Command Directive 040-002 "NATO Non-Commissioned Officer and Junior Officer Bi-Strategic Command Employment and Development Strategy" (19 December 2023), based on the NATO Non-Commissioned Officer (NCO) and Junior Officer (JO) Bi-SC Strategy and NCO Guidelines describes the NATO rank indicators for NCOs:

- OR-1 — OR-3: "These are the basic entry ranks into the military structure."
- OR-4: "The first level of leadership within the NATO NCO ranks."
- OR-5: "The OR-5 is the first NATO designated NCO grade and the level of leadership with the greatest impact on subordinate ranks."
- OR-6: "This is the first grade at which OR should be considered for Staff NCO duties at NATO higher headquarters employment. As such some NATO nations may recognize OR-6 through OR-9 as Senior NCOs (SNCO) or Warrant Officers (WO)."
- OR-7: "The OR-7 is empowered and considered a key element within the command structure. At this level, SNCOs are expected to be able to provide sound advice to their leadership. While no formal mandate exists, this is the level at which, when consistent with their national authorities, SNCOs start to provide mentorship/assistance for Junior Officers (OF-1/OF-2)."
- OR-8: "Uses enhanced leadership skills and broad operational experience to advise unit/element leaders and commanders on organizational effectiveness. OR-8s are expected to merge subordinates talents, skills, and resources with other NATO cross functional team(s) and organization(s) to implement planning and management processes for collective mission accomplishment."
- OR-9: "The most experienced SNCO within the NATO NCO structure. This grade is normally utilized in an advisory capacity when assigned to a higher headquarters."

== Non-NATO use of NATO rank codes ==
Based on the intentions of Bosnia and Herzegovina and Ukraine to join NATO, NATO codes for military ranks have been officially introduced in these countries. Bosnia and Herzegovina adopted a corresponding law in 2005. In Ukraine, the introduction of NATO codes for military ranks took place during 2019–2021, including:

Date	Event
Oct. 17, 2019	the Verkhovna Rada (Ukrainian parliament) adopted the Law of Ukraine No. 205-IX (came into force on October 1, 2020) which introduced sergeant ranks in the Armed Forces of Ukraine according to NATO standards (Note: a new scale of military ranks for privates, sergeants and petty officers has been introduced, which correspond to the equivalent NATO Code column according to STANAG 2116; a new classification of NCO ranks (junior NCOs, senior NCOs, higher NCOs) was introduced; the warrant officer ranks (praporshchik, starshy praporshchik, michman, starshy michman) were abolished)
Jun. 4, 2020	the Verkhovna Rada adopted the Law of Ukraine No. 680-IX (came into force on October 1, 2020) which introduced general officer ranks in the Armed Forces of Ukraine according to NATO standards (Note: the ranks of brigadier general and commodore were introduced; the ranks of first sergeant and colonel general were replaced by chief sergeant and general; the rank of general of the Army of Ukraine was abolished)
Sep. 7, 2020	the Order of the Ministry of Defense of Ukraine No. 317 approved the List of T/О-positions of privates and NCOs and their corresponding military ranks and tariff categories of positions, which came into force on January 1, 2021 (Note: the new list of positions was created taking into account the requirements of the NATO Non-Commissioned Officer (NCO) Bi-Strategic Command Strategy and Recommended NCO Guidelines)
Oct. 13, 2020	the Decree of the President of Ukraine No. 431/2020 amended the List of positions subject to replacement by general officers, taking into account the new system of military ranks
Jan. 6, 2021	the website of the Cabinet of Ministers of Ukraine reported that "By order of the Minister of Defense of Ukraine, the List of NATO military rank codes is being implemented according to the NATO standard STANAG 2116"

Some European NATO partners such as Austria and Ireland describe their ranks in terms of NATO rank codes for comparison with NATO forces. Finland and Sweden also had a conversion table to NATO standards prior to becoming a NATO member.

== Mapping to "star ranks" ==
General officer grades are usually defined by the number of stars they ‘wear’. In the third edition of the STANAG 2116, OF-6 to OF-10 were described as "to be used for one to five star ranks or equivalents respectively". In the fourth through sixth editions of the standard, the term 'four star' was used for the OF-9 of the Italian and Portuguese armed forces. APersP-01 Ed. A clarified that in the French forces the OF-9 "is the highest rank in the hierarchy … therefore, carry the 4 stars and 5 stars rank marks".

== Comparative ranks of member armed forces ==
- Ranks and insignia of NATO member army officers
- Ranks and insignia of NATO member army enlisted
- Ranks and insignia of NATO member air force officers
- Ranks and insignia of NATO member air force enlisted
- Ranks and insignia of NATO member navy officers
- Ranks and insignia of NATO member navy enlisted

== See also ==
- Air officer
- Comparative military ranks
- Flag officer
- Military rank correspondence system

== Bibliography ==
- APersP-01: NATO Codes for Grades of Military Personnel (Ed. A, Ver. 3) (PDF). Brussels, Belgium: NATO Standardization Office. 16 June 2022.
- STANAG 2116: NATO Codes for Grades of Military Personnel (Ed. 7). Brussels, Belgium: NATO Standardization Office. 13 January 2021.
- STANAG 2116: NATO Codes for Grades of Military Personnel (Ed. 6). Brussels, Belgium: NATO Standardization Agensy. 25 February 2010.
- STANAG 2116: NATO Codes for Grades of Military Personnel (Ed. 5) (PDF). Brussels, Belgium: Military Standardization Agency. 13 March 1996. Archived (PDF) from the original on 2024-03-13.
- "Annex 3A: NATO Codes for Grades of Military Personnel – STANAG 2116 (Ed. 4)". BRd 2: The Queen's regulations for the Royal Navy (Ver. 6) (PDF). Fareham, England: Navy Publications and Graphics Organisation. April 2017. pp. 3A-1–3A-13 (60–72).
- "Annex B: Comparative Formation/Unit Designations". APP-06: NATO Joint Military Symbology (Ed. E, Ver. 1). Brussels, Belgium: NATO Standardization Office. 11 October 2023. pp. 795–826 (829–860).
- "Extract of STANAG 2116 (Ed. 3)" (PDF). Vedbaek, Denmark: Chief of the Royal Danish Navy. October 1975. Archived (PDF) from the original on 2022-10-14.
- "Bi-SC Directive 040-002: NATO Non-Commissioned Officer and Junior Officer Bi-Strategic Command Employment and Development Strategy" (PDF). shape.nato.int. 19 December 2023.
- "NATO Non-Commissioned Officer (NCO) Bi-Strategic Command Strategy and NCO Guidelines" (PDF). shape.nato.int. 15 September 2017.
- Zakon o službi u Oružanim snagama Bosne i Hercegovine [The Law on Service in the Armed Forces of Bosnia and Herzegovina] (PDF) (in Bosnian). 5 October 2005. Archived from the original (PDF) on 2024-06-18.
- "Оглядове досьє щодо аналізу положень законодавчих актів, прийнятих за час роботи Верховної Ради України дев'ятого скликання, спрямованих на імплементацію та/чи наближення до стандартів НАТО" [Review dossier on the analysis of the provisions of legislative acts passed by the Verkhovna Rada of Ukraine of the ninth convocation aiming towards the implementation of and/or approximation to NATO standards] (PDF). research.rada.gov.ua (in Ukrainian). Research Service of the Verkhovna Rada of Ukraine. 21 July 2023.
- "Перелік чинних стандартів НАТО, прийнятих у Міністерстві оборони України, Збройних Силах України та інших складових сектору безпеки і оборони" [List of current NATO standards adopted by the Ministry of Defense of Ukraine, the Armed Forces of Ukraine and other components of the security and defense sector]. mod.gov.ua (in Ukrainian). 19 August 2026.
- RDFRA submission to the Commission on the Defence Forces (PDF). Reserve Defence Force Representative Association. January 2021.
- De Barra, Ruairi (2022). "From Aspiration to Action. Exploring New Horizons for the Defence Forces Senior Enlisted Leaders" (PDF). Defence Forces review 2022. pp. 97–104.
- Pulkki, Arto (30 January 2009). "NATO-Maiden Sotilas- Ja Palvelusarvot" (PDF). Helsingin Reservin Sanomat (in Finnish): 12–13. ISSN 0355-824X. Archived from the original (PDF) on 2021-07-22.
