= STANAG 1236 =

STANAG 1236 Glide Slope Indicators for Helicopter Operations from NATO Ships is a NATO Standardization Agreement which establishes minimum standard requirements for the nomenclature; light characteristics; beam spread and elevation; intensity and intensity control; stabilisation; and installation of glideslope indicators used in helicopter operations between ships of NATO nations.

== Sources ==
- NATO STANAG 1236 INT (Ed. 3, 2010) Glide Slope Indicators for Helicopter Operations from NATO Ships
