= STANAG 4119 =

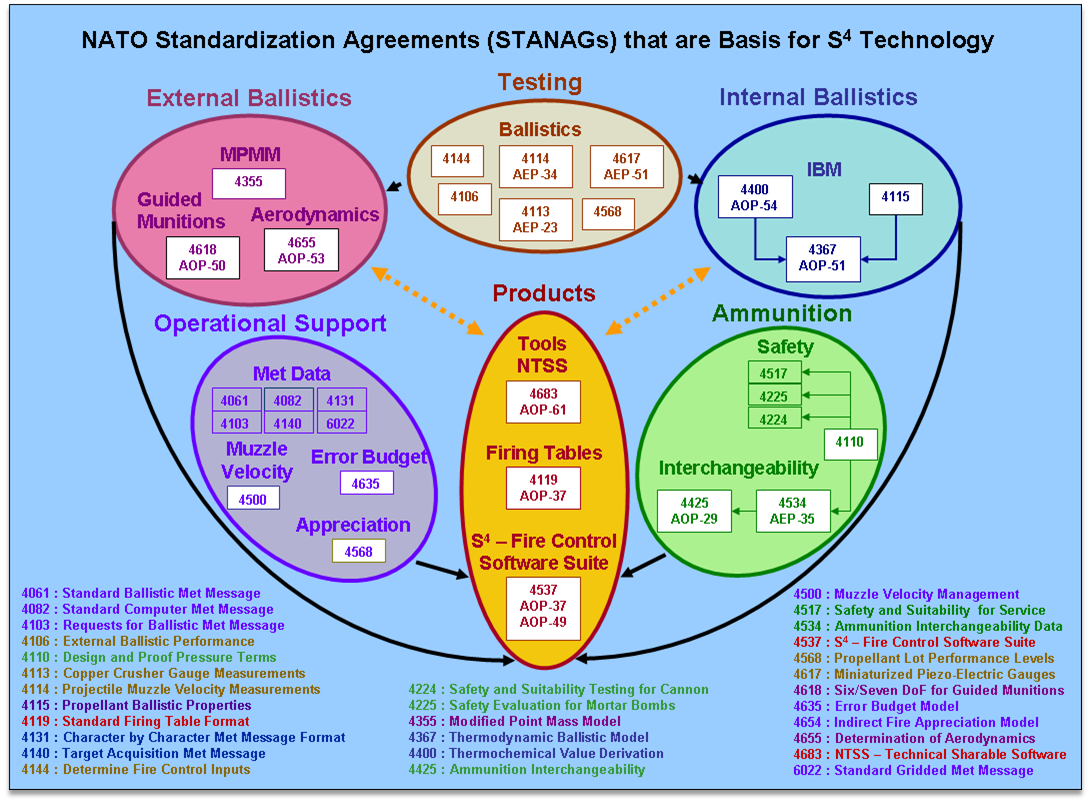
NATO Standardization Agreements (STANAGs) that are a basis for S4 Technology.

STANAG 4119 - Adoption of a Standard Cannon Artillery Firing Table Format is a NATO Standardization Agreement to describe standardized requirements for the development and publication of tabular firing tables for artillery and appropriate mortar cartridges in both complete and abridged formats.

The format of TFTs was established prior to the advent of digital computers and was intended to allow for their use by gunners in carrying out manual calculations of artillery fire-control solutions. With the general use of computer software to determine fire-control solutions, the role of TFTs has changed to one of manual backup for software-based fire-control solutions. TFTs are also employed to support exchanges of weapons, cartridges, and fire-control data between nations.

The custodian of this STANAG is Land Capability Group 3 - Sub Group 2 within the NATO Army Armaments Group (NAAG). The most recent promulgated copy is Edition 2, dated 5 February 2007. Implementation of the STANAG is often accomplished by adoption of components of the SG2 Shareable (Fire Control) Software Suite (S4).

For a description of how STANAG 4119 relates to other STANAGs in the areas of ballistics and meteorology see the illustration.
