= Cihangir Akşit =

Turkish politician

Director of the NATO Standardization Agency
- Incumbent
- Assumed office July 1, 2010
- Preceded by: Juan A. Moreno

Personal details
- Born: Emin Cihangir Akşit; July 16, 1953 (age 72) Istanbul, Turkey
- Spouse: Yasemin Akşit
- Occupation: Writer; Painter
- Profession: Army general; NATO diplomat
- Website: cihangiraksit.com

Military service
- Allegiance: Turkey
- Branch/service: Turkish Army
- Years of service: 1974–2008
- Rank: Major general
- Commands: Commander of the Presidential Guard Regiment; 14th Mechanized Infantry Brigade; 15th Infantry Division
- Staff positions: CAX Project Officer for AFSOUTH; Chief of the Personnel Management Branch for the TGS; Chief of Plan and Operations for SHAPE; Chief of Training and Exercise for the TGS; Chief of Training and Education for the TGS; Deputy Inspector General for the Turkish Land Forces Command

Emin Cihangir Akşit (born July 16, 1953) is a former director of the NATO Standardization Agency (NSA). Akşit had a forty-year military service, where he earned seventeen badges before retiring in 2008 as a major general. He is known for his establishment of total quality management and change management that modernized the Turkish Armed Forces. Akşit is also a noted author, having written three historical fiction novels, as well as articles for several military magazines and journals.

== Career ==
=== Military career ===
Akşit began his military career in 1974 when he graduated the Turkish Military Academy. From there, he held several positions within Turkey's School of Infantry, Tuzla Piyade Okulu. Akşit graduated from army staff college in Istanbul in 1984 after serving as a platoon leader and commander of various companies, battalions, regiments and divisions for the Turkish Army. He then served on staff and infantry positions. Between 1991 and 1993 he served on NATO's Allied Forces Southern Europe (AFSOUTH) as a CAX (Computer-Assisted Exercise) Project Officer. He also served on the Ministry of National Defence until 1994.

In 1994, he began serving as the Chief of the Personnel Management Branch for the General Staff of the Republic of Turkey (TGS) in Ankara. It was during this time that he established the total quality management (TQM) philosophy which was considered instrumental in the modernization of the Turkish Armed Forces. Akşit designed this form of TQM to renew the personal and evaluation systems used by the Turkish Armed Forces. It also worked to establish a better educational social system for military families that lived at military bases in Turkey.

In 1997, he was assigned for two years as Commander of the Presidential Guards Regimental Headquarters and was responsible for security at Çankaya Köşkü. While he was Commander, he applied TQM and control management to his regiment, as well as authoring two books which were later distributed to all the units of the Turkish Armed Forces. He also gave many seminars and speeches to universities on the subject such as Marmara University, Hacettepe University, Başkent University, Kocaeli University and to several major organizations such as the General Directorate of Security and the Mechanical and Chemical Industry Corporation. In 1999, Akşit was promoted to brigadier general of the 14th Mechanized Infantry Brigade in Kars at the Turkish-Armenian border, applying brigade-level TQM. Akşit returned to NATO as a Chief of Plan and Operations (OPX) for the Supreme Headquarters Allied Powers Europe (SHAPE) in September 2001 until 2003. From there he was promoted to the rank of major general and was assigned by the TGS to be Chief of Training and Exercise.

Between 2003 and 2005, Akşit and his team were responsible for establishing strategic management and planning systems for the Turkish Armed Forces. During this time, he established the NATO Defense Against Terrorism Centre of Excellence, which he personally presented to the Chief of Defence, NATO Military Committee and North Atlantic Council, as well as starting the first course in NATO Defence in Suicide Bombing. Akşit also managed the Turkish Partnership for Peace (PfP) Training Centre. In 2005, he became Chief of Training and Education. There he initiated the CO-War Academies for Tirana, Albania and Kabul, Afghanistan and managed training and education for nations that were eligible under NATO, PfP and the Mediterranean Dialogue (as well as other nations). As Chief, he and Albanian Chief of Staff Pellumb Kazimi signed an agreement for increased military cooperation between Turkey and Albania. On August 16, 2005, Akşit took over the 15th Infantry Division. From 2005 to 2007, Akşit commanded the infantry to apply divisional-level strategic planning and TQM. He was then assigned to be the Deputy Inspector General for the Turkish Land Forces Command. Between 2007 and 2008, he worked with Land Forces Command Headquarters to provide operational feedback, commanded fifty selected colonels and oversaw live exercises from forty brigades, regiments, battalions and units (including Turkish troops at bases in Bosnia and Lebanon).

=== Post-military career ===
Akşit retired as a major general in September 2008 with seventeen badges earned during his forty-year military career. He earned badges for combat operations, meritorious unit command, shooting, training, superior meritorious performance and two badges for operations success.

After retirement, he was assigned as President Abdullah Gül's defence consultant as well as Expert Consultant to the permanent Mission of Turkey to NATO in Brussels.

On July 1, 2010, he was selected by members of NATO to be the Director of the NATO Standardization Agency (NSA) where he focuses on agency reform. As director, he has made speeches at the ISPRAT 2nd International Government CIO Knowledge Exchange in Brussels as well as the 2010 and 2011 DMSMS Standardization conferences in the United States.

On March 12, 2013, Akşit and Ukrainian major general Viktor Nazarov signed a "road map" towards cooperation between the Armed Forces of Ukraine and the NSA. The document was considered important in terms of aligning the Armed Forces of Ukraine with armed forces of other NATO countries, as well getting support in standardization from the NSA. Two weeks later on March 25, 2013, the Director of the Deutsches Institut für Normung (DIN) Torsten Bahke and Akşit signed the Technical Cooperation Agreement between the DIN and NSA in Berlin, Germany.

Akşit began his writing career in 2008. He has published three novels, all of which are historical fiction. His first novel, Sarı Sessizlik Sarıkamış 1914: Bir Kayboluş Romanı was published in 2009 having previously worked on writing the novel since 1981. The same year he published his second novel, Çiğiltepe: Miralay Reşat Bey (1879–1922) ve vatan savunmasında 27 yıl. It was based on the life of Ottoman and Turkish Army officer Reşat Çiğiltepe. His latest novel, Savruluş, was published in 2011. Akşit has also written several articles for military magazines. One article he wrote, titled "Military and Chess", was published by the Ege University Faculty of Science on their website.

In 2012, Akşit was awarded his PhD in Strategic Planning and National Security Strategies from the Strategic Research Institute (SAREN) in Istanbul after taking major modules from the University of Kent.

== Personal life ==
Akşit is married to his wife, Yasemin, and has two children. Akşit's hobbies include chess, horseback riding, skiing and painting. As a painter, Akşit has taken part in several painting exhibitions since the 1970s. He had three oil painting exhibitions of his works: two in Turkey (1975 in Istanbul and 2001 in Kars) and one in Belgium (2003 in Mons).

== Bibliography ==
- The Most Beautiful War Game: Chess. Kara Kuvvetleri Dergisinin. July 1984. Archived from the original on August 11, 2014. (in Turkish)
- Yeni bir yönetim anlayışı: toplam kalite yönetimi (TKY) ve Türk Silahlı Kuvvetleri perspektifi (in Turkish). Türk Silahlı Kuvvetleri Dergisi. 1997.
- Cumhurbaşkanlığı Muhafız Alay Komutanlığında Toplam Kalite Yönetimi Uygulamaları (in Turkish). Kamu yönetiminde kalite in Ankara. May 1999.
- Sarı Sessizlik Sarıkamış 1914: Bir Kayboluş Romanı (in Turkish). Istanbul: Doğan Kitapçılık. 2009. ISBN 9786051111452.
- Çiğiltepe: Miralay Reşat Bey (1879–1922) ve vatan savunmasında 27 yıl (in Turkish). Istanbul: Doğan Kitapçılık. 2009. ISBN 9786051113043.
- Savruluş (in Turkish). Istanbul: Doğan Kitapçılık. 2011. ISBN 9786051119656.
- NATO Standardization – 60 Years of Normative Success. NATO Standardization Agency Brussels. 2011. OCLC 832134355.
- The NATO Standardization Agency—A Continuing Success Story (PDF). Defense Standardization Program Journal. October–December 2011. pp. 3–8. Archived from the original (PDF) on September 21, 2013.
- The Importance of NATO Standardisation (PDF). Defence Procurement International. 2012. pp. 1–3. Archived from the original (PDF) on September 21, 2013.

== See also ==
- NATO Standardization Agency
- Standardization Agreement
