= Allied Joint Doctrine =

NATO doctrine

The Allied Joint Doctrine teaches the warfare of the North Atlantic Treaty Organization. Its NATO library call number is STANAG 2437.
