= SG2 Shareable (Fire Control) Software Suite (S4) =

Software used by NATO

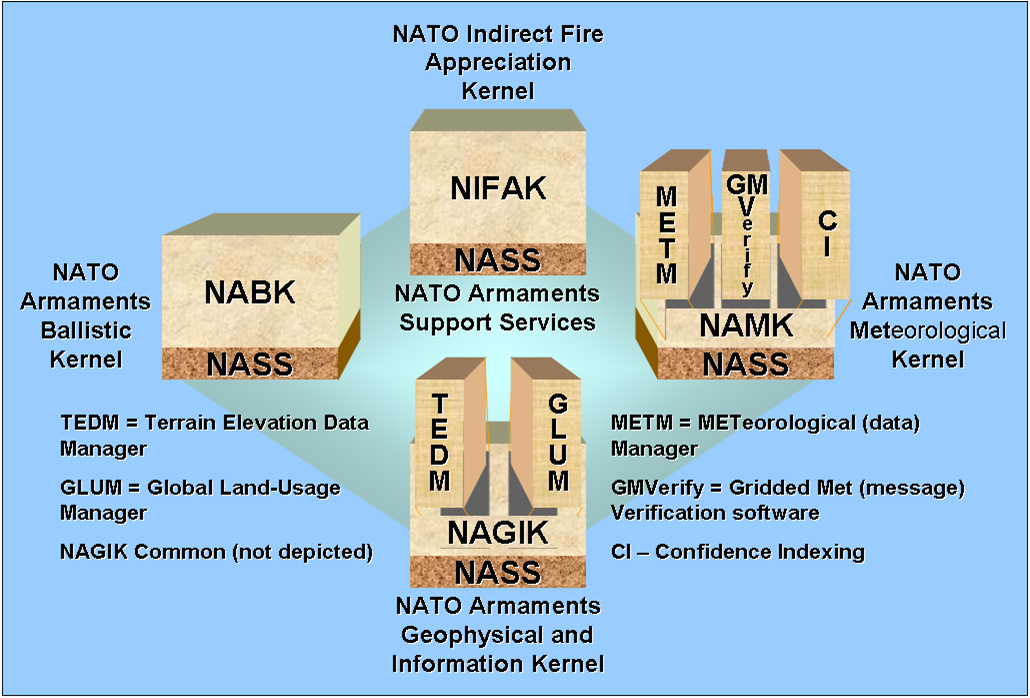
S4 Architecture Diagram

The NATO Army Armaments Group (NAAG) Integrated Capability Group Indirect Fires (ICGIF), formerly Land Group 4, and their Sub Group 2 (SG2) on Surface to Surface Ballistics has created a widely used set of shareable fire control software using the Ada programming language. This product is known as the SG2 Shareable (Fire Control) Software Suite (S4) and is sometimes abbreviated as S4 when referenced.

Fire-control system developers and most of the international (primarily NATO) ballistics communities are familiar with the mature NATO Armaments Ballistic Kernel (NABK) and other software component items that have emerged from the NABK development effort. The collection of these software items has been enhanced into the “suite” of NATO shareable fire control software.

S4 is one of the biggest pluses for NATO interoperability in the fire support domain and ammunition shareability. Quoting a recent article entitled "The NATO ammunition interchangeability challenge in the Land Domain" published in European Security and Defence at the end of 2025 (https://euro-sd.com/wp-content/uploads/2026/01/ESD_12_2025_01_2026_WEB.pdf) by Osman Tasman, "the SG/2 standards portfolio covers <...> and the famous NATO SG2 (standard) Shareable Software Suite (S4) for fire control."

Significant development effort occurs in Aberdeen, Maryland, USA in the Firing Tables and Ballistics (FTaB) Division, Armaments Research, Development and Engineering Center (ARDEC) with contributions from a variety of agencies within participating NATO nations.

== NATO Standardization Agreements (STANAGS) and Supporting Research ==
The S4 implements a variety of NATO Standardization Agreements (STANAGs) including STANAG 4355 and STANAG 6022.

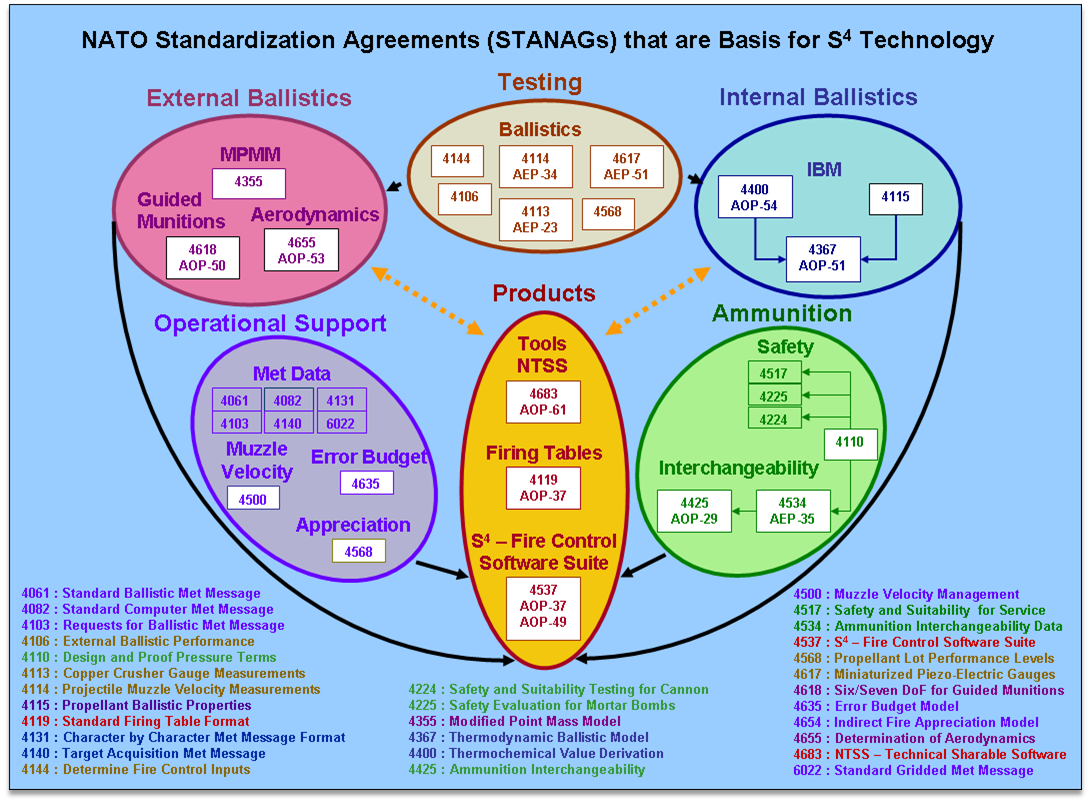
STANAG which are the basis for S4 technology

A number of papers and presentations have been published, such as a formal description of the early history of the suite and a later presentation in the International Symposium of Ballistics (ISB) forum sponsored by the International Ballistics Society (IBS).

Professur für Mess- und Informationstechnik (S4 testing research and related contributions by Germany)

Professur für Mess- und Informationstechnik (Crest Clearance algorithm contributions by Germany)

== Integrating Weapon Systems ==
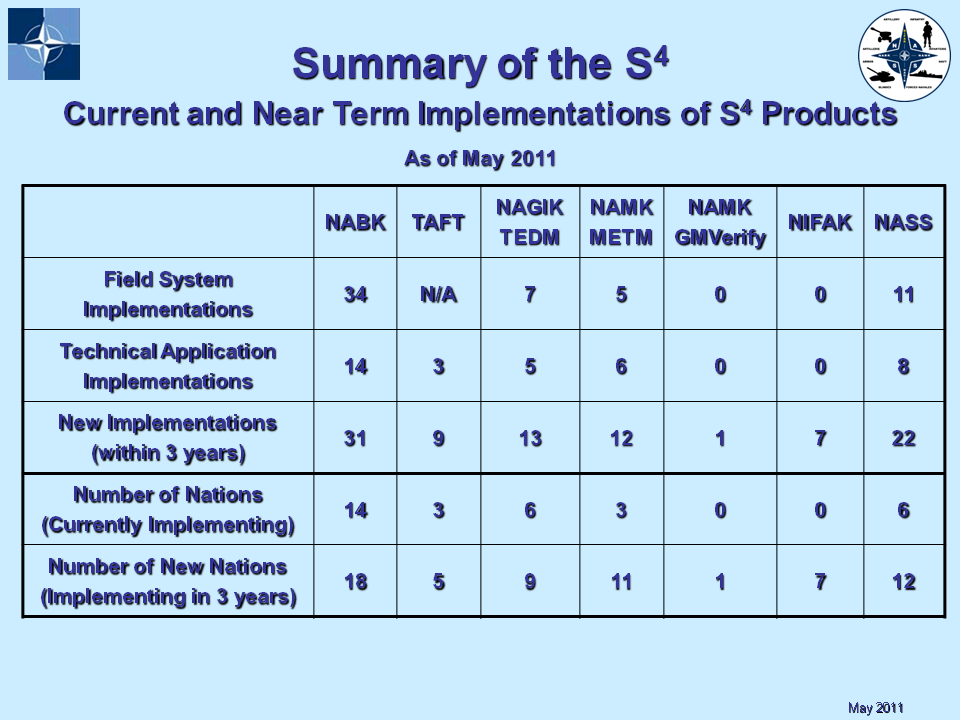
Implementation Summary

Specific examples include:

=== Canada ===
- "rca-arc.org – The Royal Regiment of Canadian Artillery - The Quadrant - DLR Technical Corner (page 8)". www.rca-arc.org.

=== Denmark ===
- "Dansk artilleri-tidsskrift" (PDF) (in Danish). April 2009. Archived from the original (PDF) on 2012-03-28.
- "SitaWare Fire Support Module".

=== France ===
- "Accueil | Knds". www.nexter-group.fr.

=== Germany ===
- Panzerhaubitze 2000
- Artillery Gun Module

=== Norway ===
- "ODIN Fire support system - Kongsberg Defence & Aerospace". www.kongsberg.com.

=== United Kingdom ===
- "THE COMPUTER AGE". nigelef.tripod.com.
