= STANAG 1472 =

NATO standardization agreement

STANAG 1472 NVD (Night Vision Device) Compatible Flight Deck Status Displays on Single Ships is a NATO Standardization Agreement which provides guidance in the design of NVD compatible Flight Deck status displays to promote maximum commonality between operating nations.

== Sources ==
- NATO STANAG 1472 INT (Ed. 1, 2011) NVD Compatible Flight Deck Status Displays on Single Ships
