= STANAG 4586 =

NATO standard for unmanned aerial vehicle control systems

STANAG 4586 (NATO Standardization Agreement 4586) is a NATO Standard Interface of the Unmanned Control System (UCS) Unmanned Aerial Vehicle (UAV) interoperability. It defines architectures, interfaces, communication protocols, data elements and message formats. It includes data link, command and control, and human/computer interfaces. The current revision is with mission phase enhancements, an updated list of vehicle identifiers etc.
