= NATO Interoperability Standards and Profiles =

== Description ==
NATO, through its interoperability directive, has recognized that widespread interoperability is a key component in achieving effective and efficient operations. In many of the operations world-wide in which NATO nations are engaged, they participate together with a wide variety of other organizations on the ground. Such organizations include coalition partners from non-NATO nations, non-governmental organizations (NGOs) and industrial partners. The NATO Interoperability Standards and Profiles (NISP) provides the necessary guidance and technical components to support project implementations and Federated Mission Networking.

The Allied Data Publication 34 (ADaTP-34) NATO Interoperability Standards and Profiles (NISP) STANAG 5524, catalogs Consultation, Command and Control (C3) standards usable in NATO. Work on the NISP is performed under the NATO Consultation, Command and Control Board.

== See also ==
- Profile (engineering)
