= Digital Geographic Exchange Standard =

NATO military standard (STANAG 7074)

NATO Standardization Agreement (STANAG) 7074, Digital Geographic Information Exchange Standard (DIGEST), is a military standard for the exchange of geographic information. It was developed by the Defence Geospatial Information Working Group (DGIWG).

== Standard ==
The standard is related to a number of other international standards. DGIWG continues to work on interoperability standards for geographic data exchange between various military systems and geographic information systems in general.

After revision 2.1 of DIGEST, released in September 2000, the DGIWG discontinued work on the standard and is focusing on incorporating its standards as profiles in ISO/TC 211.

== Authors ==
Defence Geospatial Information Working Group (DGIWG), prior to 2008 "Digital Geographic Information Working Group", is a multi-national body working on interoperability standards for geographic data exchange between military systems and geographic information systems in general. The organization has a number of member nations mostly from NATO.
