= Classes of supply =

United States Army classification system

The United States Army divides supplies into ten numerically identifiable classes of supply. The North Atlantic Treaty Organization (NATO) uses only the first five, for which NATO allies have agreed to share a common nomenclature with each other based on a NATO Standardization Agreement (STANAG 2961). A common naming convention is reflective of the necessity for interoperability and mutual logistical support.

== U.S. Armed Forces classes of supply ==
- Class I – Rations – Subsistence (food and drinking water), gratuitous (free) health and comfort items.
- Class II – Clothing And Equipment – individual equipment, tentage, some aerial delivery equipment, organizational tool sets and kits, hand tools, unclassified maps, administrative and housekeeping supplies and equipment.
- Class III – POL – Petroleum, Oil and Lubricants (POL) (package and bulk): Petroleum, fuels, lubricants, hydraulic and insulating oils, preservatives, liquids and gases, bulk chemical products, coolants, deicer and antifreeze compounds, components, and additives of petroleum and chemical products, and coal.
- Class IV – Construction materials, including installed equipment and all fortification and barrier materials.
- Class V – Ammunition of all types, bombs, explosives, mines, fuses, detonators, pyrotechnics, missiles, rockets, propellants, and associated items.
- Class VI – Personal demand items (such as health and hygiene products, soaps and toothpaste, writing material, snack food, beverages, cigarettes, batteries, alcohol, and cameras—nonmilitary sales items).
- Class VII – Major end items such as launchers, tanks, mobile machine shops, some parachute systems and vehicles.
- Class VIII – Medical material (equipment and consumables) including repair parts particular to medical equipment. (Class VIIIa – Medical consumable supplies not including blood & blood products; Class VIIIb – Blood & blood components (whole blood, platelets, plasma, packed red cells, etc.).
- Class IX – Repair parts and components to include kits, assemblies, and subassemblies (repairable or non-repairable) required for maintenance support of all equipment.
- Class X – Material to support nonmilitary programs such as agriculture and economic development (not included in Classes I through IX).
- Miscellaneous – Water, salvage, and captured material.
US Army Military Supply Class Symbols
Class I

Class II

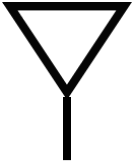
Class III

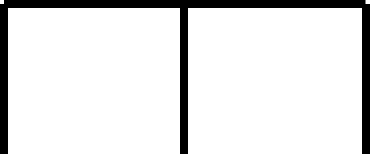
Class IV

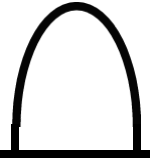
Class V

Class VI

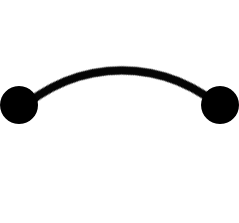
Class VII

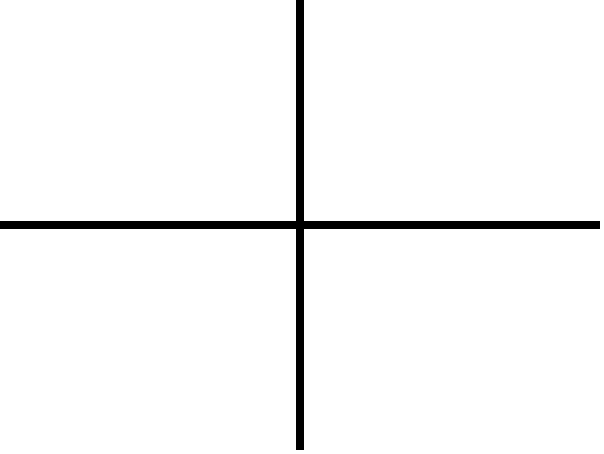
Class VIII

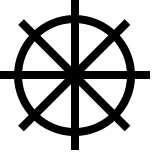
Class IX

== North Atlantic Treaty Organization classes of supply ==
- Class I – Items of subsistence, e.g., food and forage, which are consumed by personnel or animals at an approximately uniform rate, irrespective of local changes in combat or terrain conditions.
- Class II – Supplies for which allowances are established by tables of organization and equipment, e.g., clothing, weapons, tools, spare parts, vehicles.
- Class III – Petroleum, oil and lubricants (POL) for all purposes, except for operating aircraft or for use in weapons such as flamethrowers, e.g., gasoline, fuel oil, greases, coal, and coke. (Class IIIa – aviation fuel and lubricants)
- Class IV – Supplies for which initial issue allowances are not prescribed by approved issue tables. Normally includes fortification and construction materials, as well as additional quantities of items identical to those authorized for initial issue (Class II) such as additional vehicles.
- Class V – Ammunition, explosives, and chemical agents of all types.

== Popular culture ==
Class VI is usually associated with the liquor store on a U.S. military base, typically a U.S. Army or U.S. Air Force installation.

== See also ==
- Federal Supply Class
- Sustainment (United States military)
