= STANAG 5066 =

STANAG 5066 (Profile for High Frequency (HF) Radio Data Communication) is a NATO Standardization Agreement specification to enable applications to communicate efficiently over HF radio.

STANAG 5066 provides peer protocols that operate above an HF modem and below the application level. STANAG 5066 includes the mandatory SIS (Subnet Interface Sublayer, sometimes called Subnet Interface Service) protocol that enables an application to connect to an HF modem through a STANAG 5066 server over TCP/IP. This enables a clean separation between application and modem.

The standard also defines two more layers, CAS which is intended to establish connections to other HF nodes and control the status of these connections, and DTS, which controls all the data manipulation for transmission (slicing, directioning, timing...) and the reconstruction in reception.

There are two basic modes of transmission defined by this standard. ARQ and NON-ARQ.

1. ARQ uses package confirmation (through ACK response packages), and sliding window technique, which size is 128 elements. The "sending-services" can also have delivery confirmation of every package they send. It is necessarily a point-to-point protocol. It can be compared to TCP.
2. NON-ARQ is a transmission mode in which the receiver node does not confirm the well-reception of the received packages. Receivers try to compose corrupted parts from future receptions, if it is impossible, the STANAG 5066 defines that the package has to be dispatched, and mark it with the known errored parts. This transmission mode allows to use point-to-point, point-to-group and broadcast. It can be compared to UDP in the IP philosophy.

STANAG 5066 defines a SIS-to-SIS package size of 2048 bytes maximum, when using point-to-point transmitting mode (ARQ or NON-ARQ), and 4096 bytes when using broadcast (NON-ARQ only).

== See also ==
- STANAG
