= STANAG 4355 =

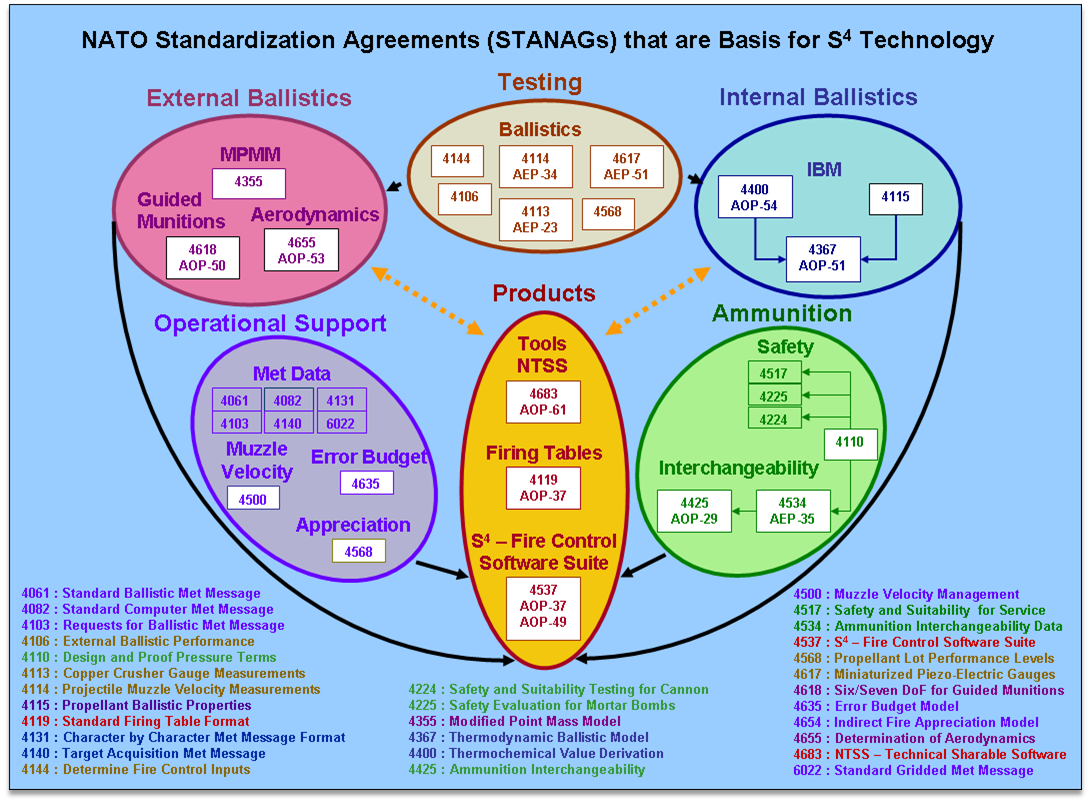

STANAG 4355 – The Modified Point Mass and Five Degrees of Freedom Trajectory Model, an element of military strategy, is a NATO Standardization Agreement for surface to surface exterior ballistic modelling in support of Artillery, mortar and rocket systems. This model is not as time-consuming to solve as the rigid body system, and uses a force system, axial spin and an estimate of the yaw of repose.

The principal aim of this agreement is to standardize the exterior ballistic trajectory simulation methodology for NATO Naval and Army Forces. The Modified Point Mass model will be used for spin-stabilized projectiles and the Five Degrees of Freedom model will be used for fin-stabilized rockets. This facilitates the exchange of exterior ballistic data and fire control information. The custodian of this STANAG is Integrated Capability Group - Indirect Fires, Sub Group 2 within the NATO Army Armaments Group (NAAG). The most recent promulgated copy is Edition 4, dated 14 September 2017. Implementation of the STANAG is often accomplished by adoption of components of the SG2 Shareable (Fire Control) Software Suite (S4) and "one of the biggest pluses for NATO in the area of fires is the 25+ year investment in the common implementation of STANAG 4355" (Vanguard Canada article - section Field Artillery (Fires))
