= Standardization agreement =

NATO technical standard (STANAG)

In NATO, a standardization agreement (STANAG, redundantly: STANAG agreement) defines processes, procedures, terms, and conditions for common military or technical procedures or equipment between the member countries of the alliance. Each NATO state ratifies a STANAG and implements it within its own military. The purpose is to provide common operational and administrative procedures and logistics, so one member nation's military may use the stores and support of another member's military. STANAGs also form the basis for technical interoperability between a wide variety of communication and information systems (CIS) essential for NATO and Allied operations. The Allied Data Publication 34 (ADatP-34) NATO Interoperability Standards and Profiles which is covered by STANAG 5524, maintains a catalogue of relevant information and communication technology standards.

STANAGs are published in English and French, the two official languages of NATO, by the NATO Standardization Office in Brussels.

Among the hundreds of standardization agreements (the total as of April 2007 was just short of 1,300) are those for calibres of small arms ammunition, map markings, communications procedures, and classification of bridges.

== Partial list ==
=== 1000s ===
STANAG 1008
(Edition 9, 24 August 2004): Characteristics of Shipboard Electrical Power Systems in Warships of the North Atlantic Treaty Navies
STANAG 1022
(Edition 6): Combat Charts, Amphibious Charts and Combat/Landing Charts
STANAG 1034
(Edition 17, 24 May 2005): Allied Naval Gunfire Support (ATP-4(E))
STANAG 1040
(Edition 23, 16 December 2004): Naval Cooperation and Guidance for Shipping (NCAGS) (ATP-2(B) Vol. 1)
STANAG 1041
(Edition 16, 29 March 2001): Anti-Submarine Evasive Steering (ATP-3(B))
STANAG 1052
(Edition 32, 12 July 2006): Allied Submarine and Anti-Submarine Exercise Manual (AXP-01(D))
STANAG 1059
(Edition 8, 19 February 2004): National Distinguishing Letters for Use by NATO Armed Forces
STANAG 1063
(Edition 18): Allied Naval Communications Exercises (AXP-3(C) MXP-3(C))
STANAG 1236
(Edition 3, 2 November 2010): Glide Slope Indicators for Helicopter Operations from NATO Ships
STANAG 1471
HOSTAC Ship Helicopter Operating Limits (SHOL)
STANAG 1472
(Edition 1, 7 September 2011): NVD Compatible Flight Deck Status Displays on Single Ships

=== 2000s ===
STANAG 2003
(Edition 6): Patrol Reports
STANAG 2014
(Edition 7): Operations Plans, Warning Orders, and Administrative/Logistics Orders
STANAG 2019
(Edition 6, 24 May 2011): NATO Joint Military Symbology – NATO Military Symbols for Land Based Systems (APP-6)
STANAG 2021
Military Load Classification of Bridges, Rafts and Vehicles
STANAG 2022
Intelligence Reports
STANAG 2033
Interrogation of Prisoners of War (PW)
STANAG 2041
(Edition 4): Operations Orders, Tables and Graphics for Road Movement
STANAG 2044
(Edition 5): Procedures for Dealing with Prisoners of War
STANAG 2083
Radiological Hazards
STANAG 2084
(Edition 5): Handling and Reporting of Captured Enemy Equipment and Documents
STANAG 2085
NATO Combined Military Police
STANAG 2087
Medical Employment of Air Transport in the Forward Area
STANAG 2097
(Edition 6): Nomenclature and Classification of Equipment
STANAG 2116
– this STANAG covers, among other subjects, NATO official rank grade comparisons covering Ranks and insignia of NATO
STANAG 2138
(Edition 4, May 1996): Troop trial Principles and Procedures – Combat Clothing and Personal Equipment
STANAG 2143
(Edition 4): Explosive Ordnance Reconnaissance/Explosive Ordnance Disposal
STANAG 2149
(Edition 3): Intelligence Request
STANAG 2154
Regulations for Military Motor Vehicle Movement by Road
STANAG 2175
(Edition 3): Classification and Designation of Flat Wagons Suitable for Transporting Military Equipment
STANAG 2310
7.62×51mm NATO adopted in the 1953 as the sole standard infantry rifle cartridge (7.62x51mm) up until STANAG 4172 in 1980.
STANAG 2324
The adoption of the US MIL-STD-1913 "Picatinny rail" as the NATO standard optical and electronic sight mount and standard accessory rail (canceled). See also 4694.
STANAG 2345
(Edition 3, 13 February 2003): Evaluation and control of personnel exposure to radio frequency fields – 3 kHz to 300 GHz
STANAG 2389
(Edition 1): Minimum Standards of Proficiency for Trained Explosive Ordnance Disposal Personnel
STANAG 2404
(Draft): Joint Anti-Armor Operations
STANAG 2509
Civil-military co-operation (CIMIC) doctrine
STANAG 2433
(published Jan 2005): The military intelligence intelligence data
STANAG 2437
Allied Joint Publication AJP-01: "ALLIED JOINT DOCTRINE"
STANAG 2525
Allied Joint Doctrine for Communications and Information Systems
STANAG 2604
(Edition 3, 14 Aug 1992): Braking Systems Between Tractors, Draw Bar Trailer And Semi-trailer Equipment Combinations For Military Use
STANAG 2805
Fording and Flotation Requirements for Combat and Support Ground Vehicles
STANAG 2832
(Edition 2): Restrictions for the Transport of Military Equipment by Rail on European Railways
STANAG 2834
(Edition 2): The Operation of the Explosive Ordnance Disposal Technical Information Center (EODTIC)
STANAG 2866
Medical Effects of Ionizing Radiation on Personnel
STANAG 2868
(Edition 4): Land Force Tactical Doctrine (ATP-35(A))
STANAG 2873
Medical Support Operations in an NBC Environment
STANAG 2889
(Edition 3): Marking of Hazardous Areas and Routes Through Them
STANAG 2895
Extreme Climatic Conditions and Derived Conditions for Use in Defining Design/Test Criteria for NATO Forces Materiel
STANAG 2920
The adoption of standards for ballistic protection levels and testing
STANAG 2931
Distinctive Markings and Camouflage of Medical Facilities and Evacuation Platforms
STANAG 2937
Survival, Emergency, and Individual Combat Rations – nutritional values and packaging
STANAG 2961
Classes of Supply of NATO Land Forces
STANAG 2984
Graduated Levels of Chemical, Biological, Radiological and Nuclear Threats and Associated Protective Measures
STANAG 2999
(Edition 1): Use of Helicopters in Land Operations (ATP-49)

=== 3000s ===
STANAG 3011
Joint Range Extension Applications Protocol (JREAP), a Tactical Data Link (TDL) protocol
STANAG 3117
Aircraft Marshalling Signals
STANAG 3150
Uniform System of Supply Classification
STANAG 3151
Uniform System of Item of Supply Identification
STANAG 3277
(Edition 6): Air Reconnaissance Request/Task Form
STANAG 3350
Analogue Video Standard for Aircraft System Applications
STANAG 3377
Air Reconnaissance Intelligence Report Forms
STANAG 3497
(Edition 1): Aeromedical Training of Aircrew in Aircrew NBC Equipment and Procedures
STANAG 3585
(Edition 6): 20×102mm ammunition and links for aircraft autocannons, based on MIL-STD-651
STANAG 3596
Air Reconnaissance Requesting and Target Reporting Guide
STANAG 3680 AAP-6
NATO Glossary of Terms and Definitions
STANAG 3700
(Edition 4): NATO Tactical Air Doctrine (ATP-33(B))
STANAG 3736
(Edition 8): Offensive Air Support Operations (ATP-27(B))
STANAG 3797
(27 Apr 2009) Minimum Qualifications for Forward Air Controllers & Laser Operators in Support of Forward Air Controllers
STANAG 3805
(Edition 4): Doctrine and Procedures for Airspace Control in Time of Crisis and War (ATP-40(A))
STANAG 3820
(Edition 3): 27×145mm autocannon ammunition
STANAG 3838
MIL-STD-1553, mechanical, electrical and functional characteristics of a serial data bus
STANAG 3880
(Edition 2): Counter Air Operations (ATP-42(B))
STANAG 3910
High Speed Data Transmission Under STANAG 3838 or Fibre Optic Equivalent Control – 1 Mbit/sec MIL-STD-1553B data bus augmented by a 20 Mbit/s, Optical or Electrical, High Speed (HS) channel. Revised by prEN 3910, which remains provisional. Optical version implemented (as EFAbus) on the Eurofighter Typhoon (EF2000)) and electrical (as EN 3910) on Dassault Rafale.

=== 4000s ===
STANAG 4007
(Edition 2, 31 May 1996): Electrical Connectors Between Prime Movers, Trailers And Towed Artillery
STANAG 4019
Emergency Towing Facilities
STANAG 4074
2-pin 24V jump-start connectors. Heavy duty plugs and sockets for jump-starting military vehicles with up to 1000A
STANAG 4082
(Edition 2, 28 May 1969): Adoption of a Standard Artillery Computer Meteorological Message (METCM)
STANAG 4090
9×19mm NATO adopted as standard small arms ammunition (9 mm)
STANAG 4101
(Edition 2, 21 Feb 2000): Towing Attachments
STANAG 4107
(Edition 7, August 2006): Mutual Acceptance of Government Quality Assurance and Usage of the Allied Quality Assurance Publications
STANAG 4140
(Edition 2, 28 May 2001): Adoption of a Standard Target Acquisition Meteorological Message (METTA)
STANAG 4114
(Edition 2, 9 May 1997): Adoption of a standard for Measurements of Projectile Velocities
STANAG 4119
(Edition 2, 5 February 2007): Adoption of a Standard Cannon Artillery Firing Table Format)
STANAG 4172
The adoption of the 5.56×45mm NATO round as the standard chambering of all NATO service rifles in 1980.
STANAG 4173
25×137mm autocannon ammunition
STANAG 4184
(Edition 3, 27 November 1998): Microwave Landing System (MLS)
STANAG 4203
Technical standards for single channel HF radio equipment
STANAG 4222
(Edition 1, 14 March 1990): Standard Specification for Digital Representation of Shipboard Data Parameters
STANAG 4232
Digital Interoperability Between SHF Tactical Satellite Communications Terminals
STANAG 4233
Digital interoperability between EHF Tactical Satellite Communications Terminals
STANAG 4285
Characteristics of 1200/2400/3600 bit/s single tone MODEMs for HF radio links
STANAG 4355
(Edition 3, 17 April 2009): Modified Point Mass Trajectory Model
STANAG 4370
Environmental Testing
STANAG 4381
(Edition 1, 8 July 1994): Blackout Lighting Systems For Tactical Land Vehicles
STANAG 4383
12.7×99mm NATO adopted as standard small arms ammunition (12.7mm)
STANAG 4385
120 mm ammunition for smoothbore tank guns
STANAG 4395
(Edition 2, 10 May 2001): Connector For Tactical Land Wheeled Vehicles With Anti Lock Braking Systems
STANAG 4406
The adoption of a military message standard based around the civil X.400 standard
STANAG 4420
Display Symbology and Colors for NATO Maritime Units
STANAG 4425
A way to determine interchangeability of indirect fire ammunition; lists various artillery calibers, including 105 mm and 155 mm
STANAG 4427
Configuration Management in System Life Cycle Management
STANAG 4458
105 mm ammunition for rifled tank guns
STANAG 4509
Technical performance specification providing for the interchangeability of 5.7×28mm ammunition
STANAG 4516
mentioned in conjunction with 35 mm x 228 KDG ammunition
STANAG 4525
Explosives, Physical/Mechanical Properties, Thermomechanical Analysis for Determining the Coefficient of Linear Thermal Expansion (TMA)
STANAG 4529
Characteristics of single tone MODEMs for HF radio links with 1240 Hz bandwidth
STANAG 4545
(Edition 2, 6 May 2013): NATO Secondary Imagery Format (NSIF)
STANAG 4559
(Edition 3, Amendment 2, 3 August 2016): NATO Standard Intelligence Surveillance Reconnaissance Library Interface (NSILI)
STANAG 4564
(Edition 1, 25 October 2007): Warship Electronic Chart Display and Information Systems (WECDIS)
STANAG 4565
(Edition 1, 26 September 2003): Airborne Multi-Mode Receiver for Precision Approach and Landing
STANAG 4569
Protection levels for Occupants of Logistic and Light Armoured Vehicles
STANAG 4575
(Edition 4, 2 December 2014): NATO Advanced Data Storage Interface (NADSI)
STANAG 4579
The adoption of standard Identification of Friend or Foe hardware that can be recognized and processed between all NATO nations
STANAG 4586
Standard Interface of the Unmanned Control System (UCS) for NATO UAV interoperability
STANAG 4603
Modelling and Simulation Architecture Standards for Technical Interoperability: High Level Architecture (HLA)
STANAG 4606
(Edition 4, 29 January 2021): Super High Frequency (SHF) MILitary SATellite COMmunications (MILSATCOM) EPM (Electronically Protected Measures) Waveform for Class B services
STANAG 4607
(Edition 3, 14 September 2010): NATO Ground Moving Target Indicator Format (GMTIF)
STANAG 4609
(Edition 4, 19 December 2016): NATO Digital Motion Imagery Standard
STANAG 4624
30x173mm autocannon ammunition
STANAG 4626
Modular and Open Avionics Architectures – Part I – Architecture
STANAG 4628
(Edition 1, 16 March 2011): Controller Area Network (Can) Protocols For Military Applications
STANAG 4671
(Edition 3, 2 April 2019): Unmanned Aircraft Systems Airworthiness Requirements (USAR)
STANAG 4676
(Edition 1, 20 May 2014): NATO Intelligence Surveillance Reconnaissance Tracking Standard (NITS)
STANAG 4694
NATO Accessory Rail
STANAG 4703
UAV
STANAG 4704
NATO requirements for calibration support of test & measurement equipment
STANAG 4748
JANUS, used for underwater acoustic communication
STANAG 4754
NATO Generic Vehicle Architecture (NGVA) for Land Systems
STANAG 4774
Confidentiality Label Syntax
STANAG 4778
Metadata Binding Mechanism
STANAG 4820
Technical performance specification providing for the interchangeability of 4.6 mm X 30 ammunition

=== 5000s ===
STANAG 5066
The adoption of a Profile for HF Data Communications, supporting Selective Repeat ARQ error control, HF E-Mail and IP-over-HF operation
STANAG 5516
Link 16 – ECM Resistant Tactical Data Exchange, a Tactical Data Link (TDL) protocol
STANAG 5518
Joint Range Extension Applications Protocol (JREAP), a Tactical Data Link (TDL) protocol
STANAG 5524
NATO Interoperability Standards and Profiles, a catalogue of relevant information and communication technology standards
STANAG 5602
Standard Interface for Military Platform Link Evaluation (SIMPLE), a Tactical Data Link (TDL) protocol

=== 6000s ===
STANAG 6001
(Edition 4, 12 October 2010) Language Proficiency Levels
STANAG 6004
Meaconing, Intrusion, Jamming, and Interference Report
STANAG 6010
EW in the Land Battle (ATP-51)
STANAG 6022
(Edition 2, 22 March 2010): Adoption of a Standard Gridded Data Meteorological Message (METGM)

=== 7000s ===
STANAG 7023
(Edition 4, Amendment 1, 16 June 2016): NATO Primary Image Format (NPIF)
STANAG 7024
(Edition 2, 2 August 2001): Imagery Air Reconnaissance Tape Recorder Standard
STANAG 7074
Digital Geographic Exchange Standard (DIGEST),
STANAG 7141
(Edition 4, 20 December 2006): Joint NATO Doctrine for environmental protection during NATO-led military activities
STANAG 7170
(Edition 2, 5 November 2010): Additional Military Layers (AML) – Digital geospatial data products

== Drafts ==
STANAG 4179
A type of detachable firearm magazine proposed for standardization based on the USGI M16 rifle magazine.
STANAG 4181
A type of stripper clip and guide tool use to load magazines proposed for standardization based on the USGI M16 rifle stripper clips and guide tools.
