= STANAG 4140 =

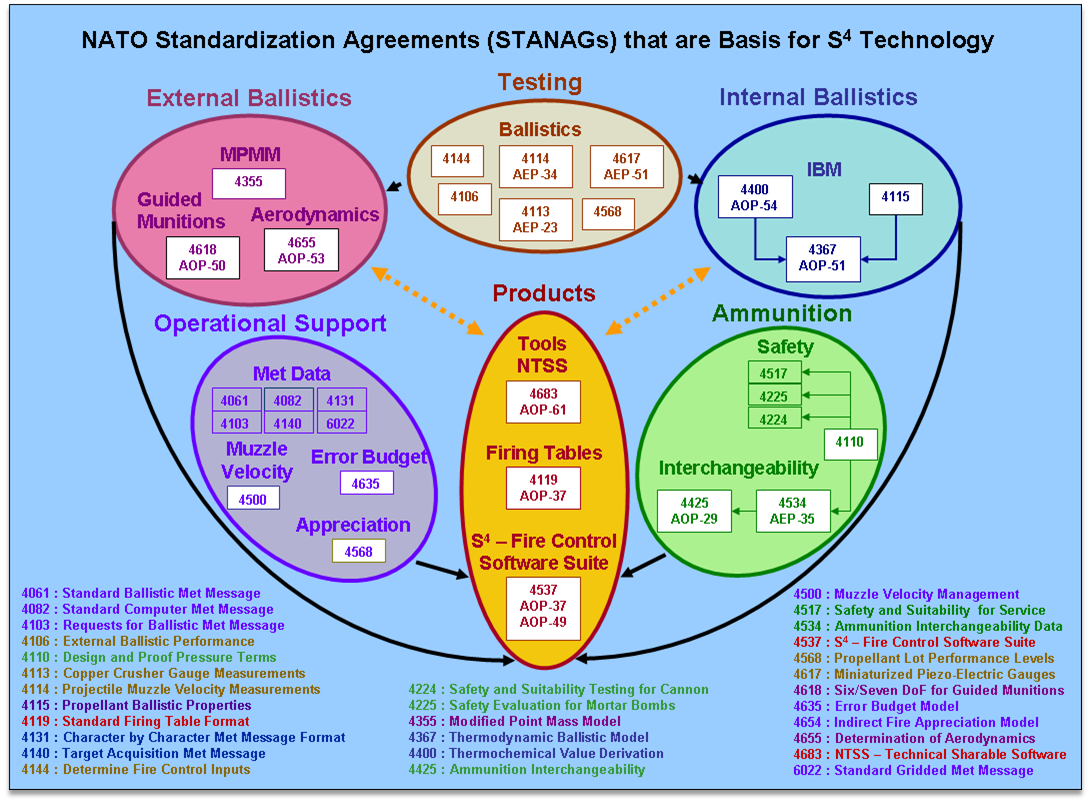

STANAG 4140 - Adoption of a Standard Target Acquisition Meteorological Message (METTA) is a NATO Standardization Agreement to provide meteorological information such as refractive index, temperature, pressure and cloud cover for remotely piloted vehicles, drones, weapon locating radars and sound ranging systems.

The custodian of this STANAG is the MILMET panel, formerly BMWG, within NATO Headquarters. The most recent promulgated copy is Edition 2, dated 28 May 2001. Edition 2 was cancelled in May 2019 and is superseded by STANAG 6015.

STANAG 4140 relates to other Standardization Agreements in the areas of ballistics and meteorology, as shown in the attached pictorial representation (also shown in slide 4 of the following presentation)
