= STANAG 4082 =

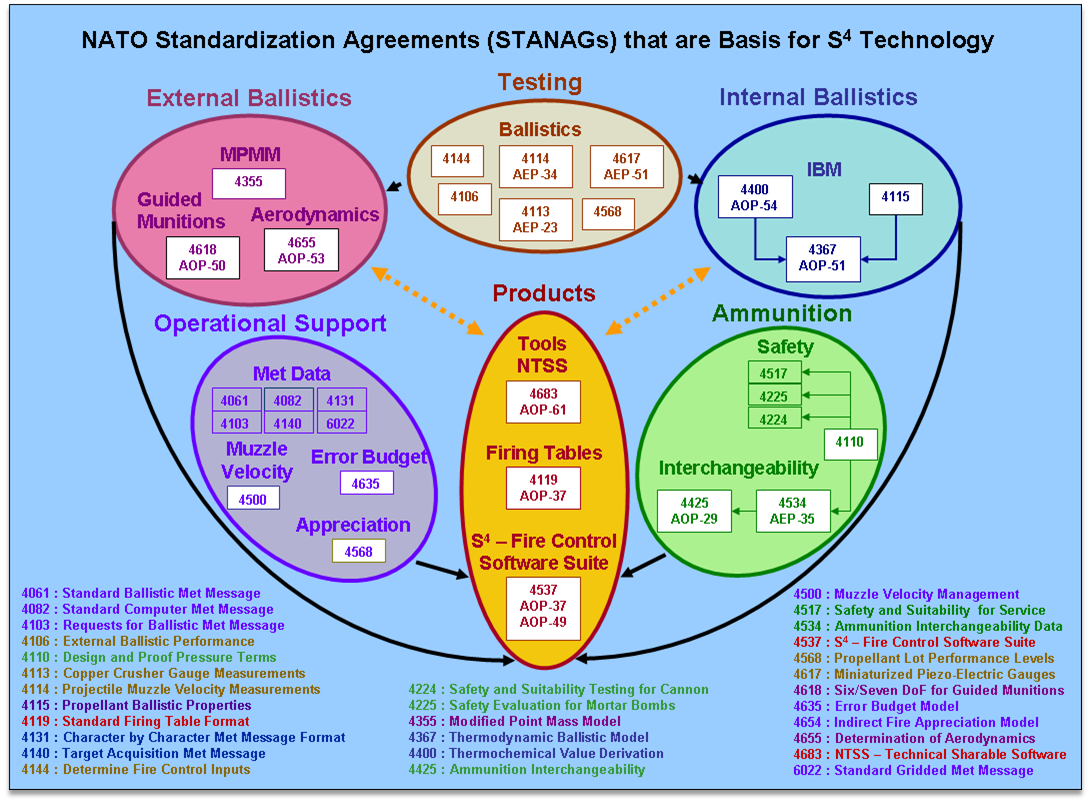

STANAG 4082 - Adoption of a Standard Artillery Computer Meteorological Message (METCM) is a NATO Standardization Agreement to provide meteorological information for External ballistics. The information consists of virtual temperature, pressure, and wind speed/direction.

The custodian of this STANAG is the MILMET panel, formerly BMWG, within NATO Headquarters. The Edition 2 of this STANAG was promulgated 28 May 1969. Edition 3 was cancelled in May 2019 and is superseded by STANAG 6015 .

For a description of how STANAG 4082 relates to other STANAGs in the areas of ballistics and meteorology please see the following preview (also shown in slide 4 of the following presentation).
