= AN/PRC-152 =

US military multiband handheld radio

AN/PRC-152
noframe
Type	Handheld tactical radio
Service History
In service	2005-
Used by	United States Army, US Marines, US Navy, US Air Force, Canadian Army, Armed Forces of Ukraine (export version)
Conflicts	Iraq War, War in Afghanistan, Operation Inherent Resolve, Russo-Ukrainian War
Production history
Manufacturer	L3Harris
Produced	2005-
Number built	Over 100,000 (as of 2012)
Specifications
Frequency range	30-520 MHz, 762-870 MHz
Transmit power	up to 5 watts
Modes	analog and digital voice, digital data
Encryption	NSA Type 1 algorithms (Top Secret and below)

The AN/PRC-152 Multiband Handheld Radio, is a portable, compact, tactical software-defined combat-net radio manufactured by Harris Corporation. It is compliant without waivers to the Joint Tactical Radio System (JTRS) Software Communications Architecture (SCA). It has received NSA certification for the transmission of Top Secret data.

In accordance with the Joint Electronics Type Designation System (JETDS), the "AN/PRC-152" designation represents the 152nd design of an Army-Navy electronic device for portable two-way communications radio. The JETDS system also now is used to name all Department of Defense electronic systems.

== Users ==
The AN/PRC-152 radio began production in 2005. Since then, over 100,000 have been provided to the US military. The PRC-152 has been notably used by Prince Harry during his service with the British Army, then a 23-year-old second lieutenant in the Household Cavalry. He was responsible for providing cover for troops on the frontline as a Forward Air Controller (FAC) employing the AN/PRC-152 and other systems.

Ukraine, as part of western military aid, began receiving Harris radios during the war in Donbas. This included the Harris RF-310M-HH, an export version of the PRC-152 without NSA Type 1 encryption.

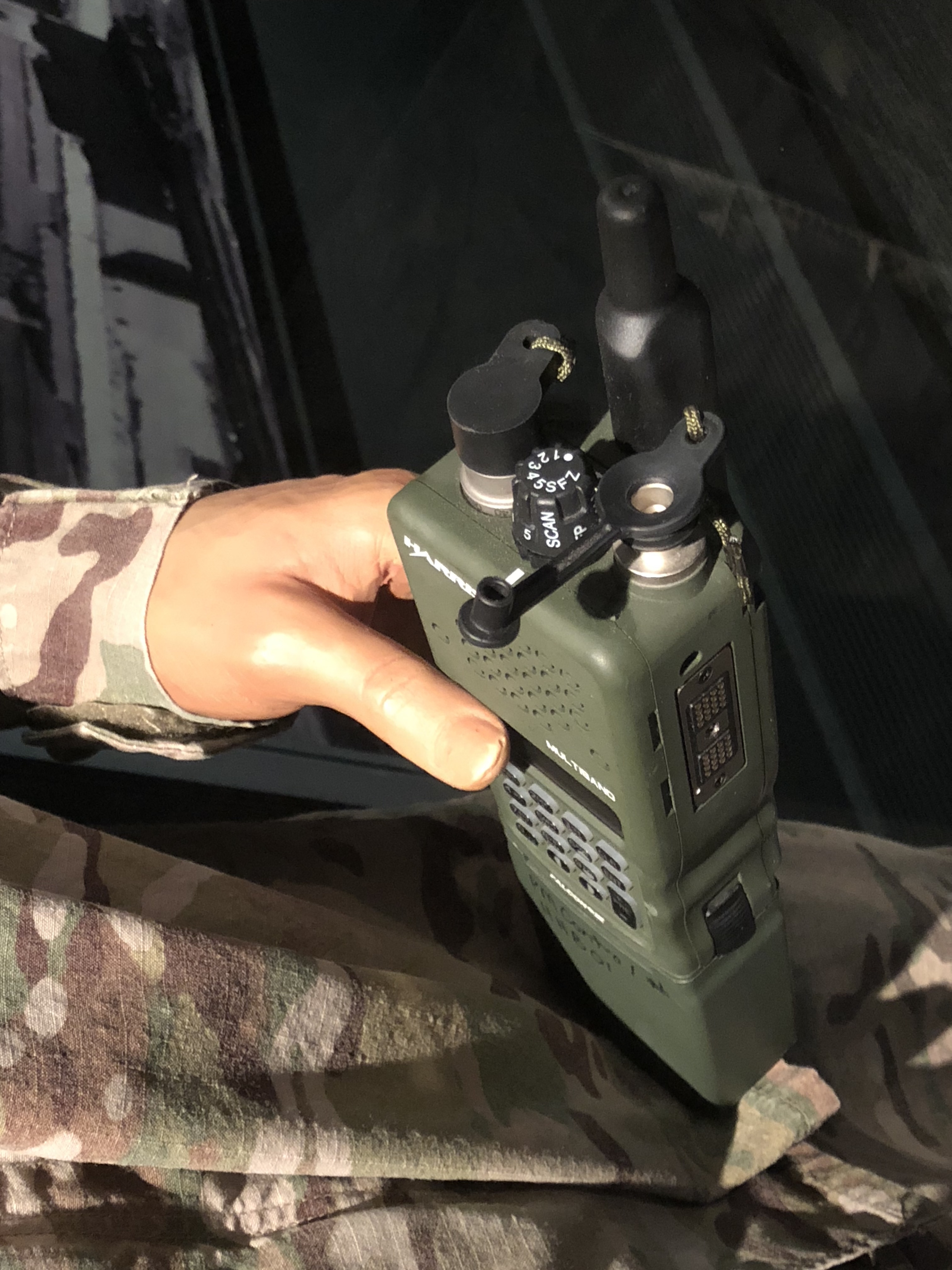
AN/PRC-152

== Specifications ==
=== General ===
- Frequency Range: 30 to 511.99 MHz
- Presets: 99
- Transmission Modes: FM, AM, PSK, CPM
- Tuning Resolution: 10 Hz

=== Transmitter ===
- Output Power: 250 mW to 5 W / VSAT 10 W
- Harmonic Suppression: –47 dBc
- Frequency Stability: +/- 2.5 ppm

=== Receiver ===
- FM Sensitivity -116 dBm (12 dB SINAD)
- Adjacent Channel Greater than 55 dB Rejection

=== Interoperability ===
- Crypto Modes KY-57/VINSON, ANDVT/KYV-5, KG-84C, FASCINATOR, AES
- Fill devices: AN/CYZ-10 DTD, AN/PYQ-10 Simple Key Loader (SKL) (Supports DS-101, DS-102 and Mode 2/3)
- Radios
  - AN/PRC-117F
  - AN/PRC-113
  - AN/PRC-119A/B
  - AN/PRC-148
  - AN/PRC-150
  - AN/PRC-153
  - AN/PRC-154
  - AN/PRC-163
  - AN/PRC-77 Portable Transceiver
  - PSC-5
  - AN/PRC-117G
  - RF-310
- Optional internal GPS

=== Interfaces ===
- External Data: RS-232, RS-422, MIL-STD-188-114A
- Remote control: USB, RS-232
- Antenna: 50 Ohm TNC
- Audio: Six-pin Standard

=== Physical Dimensions ===
- 64(68.6 GPS) x 234 x 43 mm 2.5(2.7 GPS) W x 9.2 H x 1.7 D inches (with battery)
- Weight: 1.22 kg 2.7 lb (with battery and GPS)

=== Environmental ===
- Temperature: −31 °C to 60 °C
- Immersion: 2 Meter
- Test Method: MIL-STD-810F
- Finish: CARC Green, CARC Khaki

=== Key Features ===
- SCA v2.2
- Sierra II Programmable Crypto
- Built-in Speaker/Mic
- Full Numeric Keypad
- NVG Compatible Display
- Embedded GPS (optional)
- MELP

=== Waveforms ===
- SINCGARS
- VHF/UHF AM/FM (VULOS)
- MIL-STD-188-181B Advanced Narrowband Digital Voice Terminal (ANDVT) and 56 kbit/s data
- HAVE QUICK II
- High performance waveform (HPW)
- Satcom
- OTAR
- A software option supports Project 25 (APCO-25), used by federal, state, province and local public safety agencies in North America, including Triple DES encryption.

== See also ==
- AN/PRC-150
- AN/PRC-154
- AN/PRC-117F
- AN/PRC-119
- AN/PRC-113
- AN/PRC-148
- Tactical Vest Antenna System
- List of military electronics of the United States
