= AN/PRC-163 =

US military dual-channel handheld radio

AN/PRC-163
noframe
Type	Handheld dual channel tactical radio
Service History
In service	2018 - ongoing
Used by	US Army, US Marine Corps, US Navy, US Air Force, British Army, Canadian Army
Production history
Manufacturer	L3Harris
Production years	2018 - ongoing
Specifications
Frequency range	VHF, UHF (see specifications)
Transmit power	LOS: up to 5 watts SATCOM: up to 10 watts
Modes	analog voice, digital voice and data
Encryption	NSA Type 1 (up to Secret)

The AN/PRC-163 Multi-channel Handheld Radio, is a dual-channel tactical handheld radio manufactured by L3Harris Technologies, Inc. for the U.S. military, referred to by the U.S. Army as the Leader Radio. It is capable modes such as VHF/UHF Line-of-Sight (VULOS), SINCGARS, Soldier Radio Waveform, Tactical Scalable MANET, P25 as well as the Mobile User Objective System satellite communication mode. The dual channel capability allows a soldier to simultaneously communicate on two separate radio networks. It has received NSA certification for the transmission of Top Secret information with an appropriate encryption key. The PRC-163 is one of the Handheld, Manpack & Small Form Fit (HMS) components of the Integrated Tactical Network family of radios, the U.S. Army's modernization strategy for tactical radios. It is a member of L3Harris' Falcon IV family of tactical radios, and the successor to the Falcon III-family AN/PRC-152 Multiband Handheld Radio.

In accordance with the Joint Electronics Type Designation System (JETDS), the "AN/PRC-163" designation represents the 163rd design of an Army-Navy electronic device for portable two-way communications radio. The JETDS system also now is used to name all Department of Defense electronic systems.

== Service history ==
The PRC-163 is in use by the U.S. Army, Air Force, Navy, and Marine Corps, Canadian Army as well as the British Army. The U.S. Army is set to purchase over 100,000 PRC-163 radios.

== Specifications ==
=== General ===
Frequency Range:

- R/T 1:

VHF low: 30–88 MHz (10.0–3.4 m), VHF high: 118–174 MHz (2.54–1.72 m)
UHF: 225–512 MHz (1.332–0.586 m)
SATCOM: Uplink 300–320 MHz (1.00–0.94 m) / Downlink 360–380 MHz (0.83–0.79 m)
UHF SATCOM: Uplink 291–318 MHz (1.03–0.94 m) / Downlink 243–270 MHz (1.23–1.11 m)

- R/T 2:

UHF: 225–450 MHz (1.33–0.67 m)
L/S-band: 1.3–2.6 GHz (0.23–0.12 m)

Modes:

- Voice: Narrowband analog/PCM AM/FM, CVSD ASK/FSK ciphertext, Wideband 2400 bit/s MELPe, LPC/2400-MELP – SATCOM Integrated Waveform (IW)
- Data: Narrowband analog/PCM AM/FM, CVSD ASK/FSK ciphertext, Wideband up to 16 Mbit/s
- Power Output: 250 mW to 5 W, 10 W SATCOM modes, 3.2 W L/S-band
- Encryption: Denali-based NSA Type 1 Suite A/B (Trust Anchor capable), AES-256
- Net Presets: 99 (standard); unlimited with multiple mission files
- GPS: Built-in module—SAASM L1/L2 or Commercial L1
- Programming: Front Panel Programmable (FPP), Windows PC-based Communications Planning Application (CPA) via USB connection.

=== Waveforms ===
- Standard Waveforms:

Channel 1: VHF/UHF Line-of-Sight (LOS), Adaptive Networking Wideband Waveform Coordination Capability (ANW^{2}C), SINCGARS, P25 (Conventional)
Channel 2: ANW^{2}C, UHF LOS, UHF SATCOM

- Optional Waveforms:

Channel 1: SATURN, High Performance Waveform (HPW), IW Phase 1/2, HAVEQUICK I/II, P25T Trunking (Low Band), SCM and e-BFT (DoD only)
Channel 2: TSM-X, L-TAC, Wraith

=== Interfaces ===
- Data: USB 2.0, IP over USB, Ethernet
- Audio: 19-pin ADF, 2-channel audio + KDU, USB 2.0, fill
- Antenna Ports: TNC female, 50 Ω characteristic impedance
- Key Fill: DS-101 (via AN/PYQ-10 Simple Key Loader)
- External Mission Module: Power, data, control/status

=== Physical ===
- Dimensions (H-W-D): 6 in × 3 in × 2 in (152 mm × 76 mm × 51 mm)
- Weight: 2.75 pounds (1.25 kg) (with battery)
- Color/Finish: Chemical Agent Resistant Coating (CARC) green

=== Environmental ===
- Operating Temperature: −22 to 140 °F (−30 to 60 °C)
- Storage Temperature: −40 to 185 °F (−40 to 85 °C)
- Immersion: 66 feet (20 m)

== See also ==
- List of military electronics of the United States
