= Combat-net radio =

Type of radio used in military operations

In telecommunications, a combat-net radio (CNR) is a radio operating in a network that (a) provides a half-duplex circuit and (b) uses either a single radio frequency or a discrete set of radio frequencies when in a frequency hopping mode.

CNRs are primarily used for push-to-talk-operated radio nets for command and control of combat, combat support, and combat service support operations among military ground, sea, and air forces.

In the United States, two military standards govern the use of combat net radios and the host applications that communicate over the network: MIL-STD-188-220 and MIL-STD-2045-47001. In addition to IETF RFCs governing UDP, TCP, and IPv4/IPv6, all seven layers of the OSI communications architecture are addressed. MIL-STD-2045-47001 covers layer 7 (application), while MIL-STD-188-220 covers layers 1 through 3 (physical, data link, and network).

== Examples ==
- AN/PRC-152 by Harris Corporation
- AN/PRC-117
- AN/PRC-77
- SINCGARS
- AN/PRC-148 MBITR
- PR4G by Thales Communications
- PRC-525 by EID
- Clansman
- Leopard1 by Sat-Com Pty Ltd

== See also ==
- JTRS
- Joint Electronics Type Designation System
- Software-defined radio
