= CARC =

CARC may refer to:

- CARC (Kingston University), the Contemporary Art Research Centre at Kingston University
- CARC Party, a far-left extra-parliamentary political party in Italy
- Chemical Agent Resistant Coating, paint commonly applied to military vehicles which provides protection against chemical and biological weapons
- Civil Aviation Regulatory Committee, the decision-making body of the Canadian Aviation Regulation Advisory Council
- Club Atlético Rosario Central, an Argentine sports club
- Clydesdale Amateur Rowing Club, Glasgow, Scotland
- 2-hydroxy-6-oxo-6-(2-aminophenyl)hexa-2,4-dienoate hydrolase (CarC), an enzyme
- Carc, a raven character in The Hobbit
- CARC system (Cardano Reattivo Compatto), introduced by Italian motorcycle manufacturer Moto Guzzi

== See also ==
- Philippine Science High School Cordillera Administrative Region Campus (PSHS-CARC)
