= R-187 Azart =

Russian military radio

R-187-P1 "Azart"
noframe
Type	Handheld tactical radio
Service History
In service	since 2014
Used by	Russian Armed Forces, Russian public safety agencies
Wars	Syrian Civil War, Russo-Ukrainian War
Production history
Manufacturer	NPO Angstrem
Production years	2014 - ongoing
Specifications
Frequency range	27-520 MHz
Transmit power	up to 4 watts
Modes	analog voice, digital voice and data
Weight	466 g (w/o battery and antenna)

The R-187 "Azart" (Russian: Р-187 "Азарт", "Excitement") is a Russian tactical and public safety software-defined handheld radio developed and produced by NPO Angstrem for the Russian Ministry of Defense. It is a component of the Ratnik infantry combat system.

== Service ==
The Azart-P1 was first seen in use by Russian public safety agencies during the 2014 Winter Olympics in Sochi, Russia. The Azart-P1 has seen service with the Russian Armed Forces during its involvement in the Syrian Civil War, and the Russian invasion of Ukraine, during which many Azart radios have been captured by Ukrainian soldiers.

The R-187 is present only in select units of the Russian Army. It has been reported that, during the war in Ukraine, the Russian Army and Donbas militias have been employing three generations of radio systems: the Soviet-era R-123 and R-173 and the R-168 "Aqueduct" series and the R-187 Azart in limited numbers.

The model in service with the Russian Armed Forces is the R-187-P1, the export model is the R-187-P1E. The R-187V is a vehicle mounted version of the R-187-P1 with a higher transmit power and larger frequency range.

== Technical characteristics ==
The Azart-P1 is capable of VHF/UHF Line of Sight (VULOS) communications in simplex modes, duplex, and repeater modes. It is also compatible with TETRA networks in trunked and conventional modes, and GSM 900/1800 cellular networks.

The radio is supplied with a 27-520 MHz long antenna to cover the radios entire frequency range, a medium 100-520 MHz antenna, and a short 136-520 MHz antenna. Ukrainian radio experts report these antennas typically achieve a standing wave ratio of 1.5 to 3.

The Radio can be used as a repeater station and can utilise GLONASS or GPS to provide positioning.

== Specifications ==
- Frequency range: 27 - 520 MHz
- Modes: analog (AM, FM, USB, LSB) and digital (GSM, TETRA)
- Data speed: up to 256 kbit/s, typically 7.2 kbit/s
- Frequency hoprate: >20,000 hops/second ("Azart" waveform), 100 hops/second ("Aqueduct" waveform)
- Transmit power: up to 4 watts
- Navigation: GPS, GLONASS
- Storage capacity: 512 MB
- Antenna connector: TNC female
- Interfaces: USB, RS-485, Bluetooth
- Battery life: up to 12 hours
- Weight: 466 grams (w/o battery and antenna)

== Predecessor R-168 Aqueduct ==
R-168

R-168 "Aqueduct" is a shortwave radio family of the Russian Forces. This is a family of tactical radio sets serves as the technological link between older Soviet analog technology and the modern, fully digital generation, such as the R-187P1 Azart.

The R-168 system was developed in the late 1990s and early 2000s by the Voronezh Research Institute of Radio Communications (VNIIS) to ensure secure, eavesdrop-proof communication at the tactical command level—ranging from individual soldiers and battalions up to regimental headquarters.

Portable radio options include handheld and manpack units, such as the R-168-0.1U (a very compact model for individual soldiers) and the R-168-5UN (a manpack/backpack unit for unit commanders). For vehicle-based applications, the R-168-100U and R-168-100K models are integrated into combat vehicles—such as BTR-82A armored personnel carriers or T-72B3 main battle tanks—as well as mobile command centers.

Like the Azart system, R-168 utilizes both shortwave (HF)—for longer distances via ground-wave propagation—and very high/ultra-high frequency (VHF/UHF) bands for direct line-of-sight communication in combat. The system incorporates frequency-hopping spread spectrum (FHSS) technology and integrated cryptographic encryption units for the digital transmission of voice and data. In addition to voice, the devices can transmit tactical data (such as GPS/GLONASS coordinates or target assignments) to digital command-post systems.

== Comparable radios ==
- AN/PRC-148
- AN/PRC-152
- AN/PRC-153
