= FCS Network =

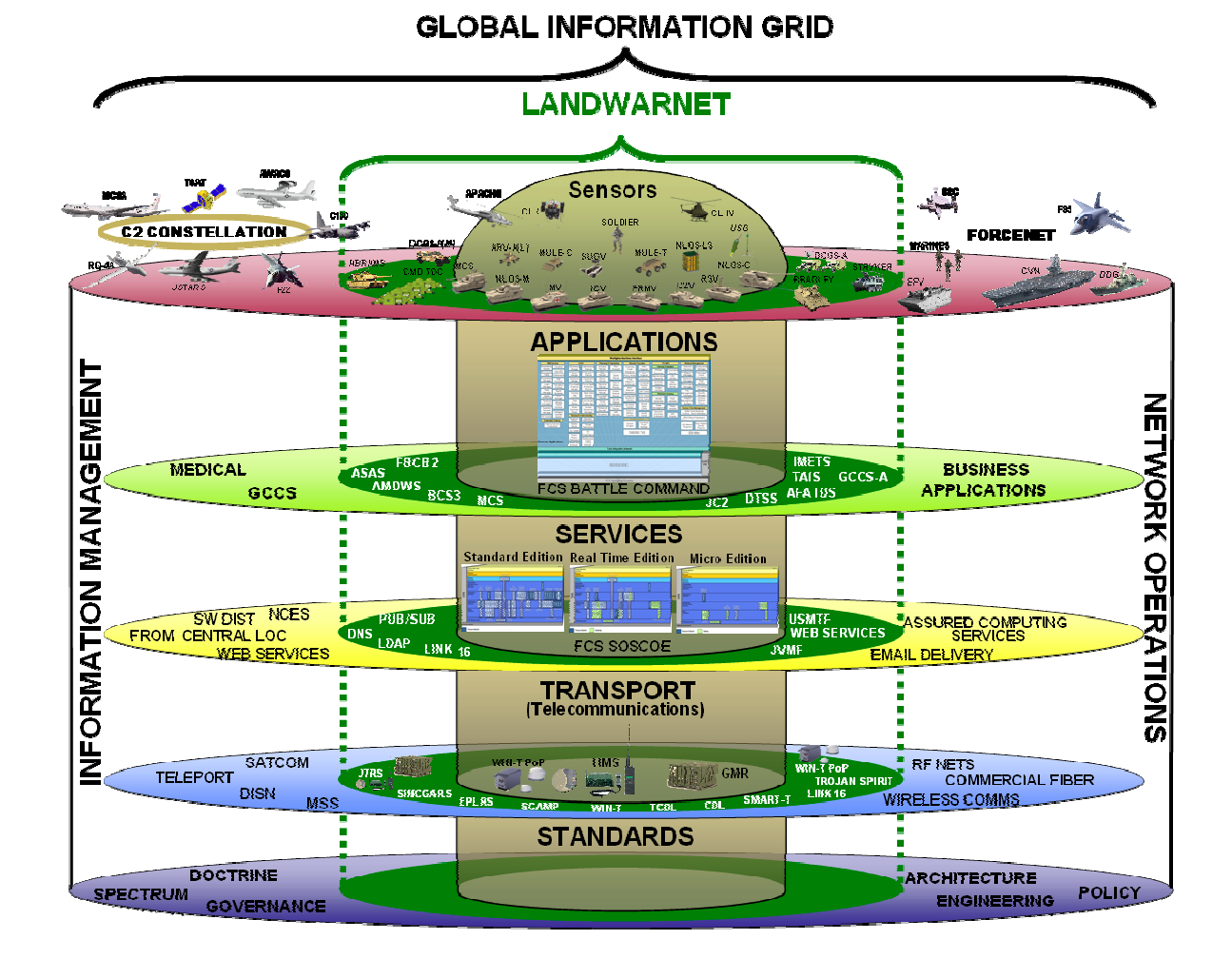
The scope of the layers

The FCS Network - (Future Combat Systems) Brigade Combat Team (BCT) Network consists of five layers that deliver data to forward-deployed Army units.

When fully adopted by the Army over the next two decades, the FCS (BCT) Network will possess the adaptability and management functionality required to maintain pertinent services, while the assigned FCS Brigade Combat Team fights on a rapidly shifting battlespace. The FCS (BCT) network will also dispatch targeting and other coordinating data to Navy and Air Force components for total force integration in the battlespace.

== Sensors and platforms layer ==
Sensors are the hardware and software that will provide FCS with the ability to "see first" and achieve situational awareness and understanding of the battlefield. Sensor layer allows soldiers to detect, identify, and track both enemy and friendly systems and to survey the terrain around them. The intelligence, surveillance and reconnaissance sensors will be integrated onto all manned and unmanned ground vehicles, and will be capable of accomplishing a variety of missions. The unmanned aerial vehicles will be able to maneuver to an area of attack and the onboard sensors will provide surveillance of targets and terrain, among other functions. In addition, FCS has two types of unattended ground sensor systems, Tactical-Unattended Ground Sensors (T-UGS) and Urban-Unattended Ground Sensors (U-UGS). T-UGS provide intelligence, surveillance, and reconnaissance awareness to the BCTs, while U-UGS support clearing operations in confined spaces or urban chokepoints. All sensors are connected to the Common Operational Picture. The Common Operational Picture (COP) gives the soldier a good overview and understanding of their battlespace.

== Applications layer ==
The applications layer is responsible for providing the integrated ability to assess, plan, and execute network-centric mission operations using a common interface. It consists of ten software packages known as Battle Command applications. The combined capabilities of the Battle Command software packages enable full interaction among the FCS (BCTs), and provide the ability to understand the battle situation first. Understanding first is the ability to see the patterns, understand the enemy's concept of operations, his scheme of maneuver, and then exploit his decisive points and vulnerabilities. The applications layer provides the ability for cross Battlefield Functional Area (BFA) problem solving and decision aiding capability for all brigades and below echelons.

== Services layer ==
The services layer is commonly referred to as System-of-Systems Common Operating Environment (SoSCOE). SoSCOE provides interoperability with existing systems, intra and inter platform networking (including e-mail and web services), data services and information assurance, and search capabilities. The Services Layer also contains administrative applications that provide capabilities including login service, startup, logoff, erase, alert/emergency restart and monitoring control. It enables straightforward integration of separate software packages, independent of their location, connectivity mechanism and the technology used to develop them. SoSCOE has three different variants: Micro Edition, Realtime Edition, Standard Edition. Multiple editions allow SoSCOE to meet performance, scalability, portability, and interoperability requirements of FCS platforms.

== Transport layer ==
The transport layer is the telecommunications layer. It provides the radios and computers to process information. It improves current force communication limitations because it is primarily embedded in the mobile platforms and moves with the combat formations. The transport layer provides ground, aerial, and space communications across the battlefield. It allows information to move seamlessly between FCS variants and Soldiers. The FCS communications network consists of a three tiered transport layer; terrestrial, airborne, and space. The terrestrial tier is based on the Joint Tactical Radio System (JTRS) Ground Mobile Radio (GMR) and Handheld, Manpackable, Small Form Factor (HMS) radios running two transformational waveforms, the Soldier Radio Waveform (SRW), and the Wideband Networking Waveform (WNW). Both radios will also run select legacy waveforms to provide current force and Joint interoperability.

== Standards Layer ==
The standards layer, the foundation of the FCS (BCT) network, provides governance for the network's implementation (i.e. rules the soldier has to accommodate). It also describes how sensor data from non-FCS sources can be used by the FCS network. This ensures that FCS components will work together properly. Conformance to these standards permits seamless interoperability with combined and coalition forces for all National Security Systems (NSS) and Information Technology (IT) systems.

== See also ==
- Global Information Grid
- LandWarNet
