= IISR =

IISR may refer to:

- Integrated, Intra-Squad Radio
- Indian Institute of Science and Religion
- International Indian School, Riyadh
- Indian Institute of Spices Research
