= Joint Tactical Radio System =

Proposed US military radio system

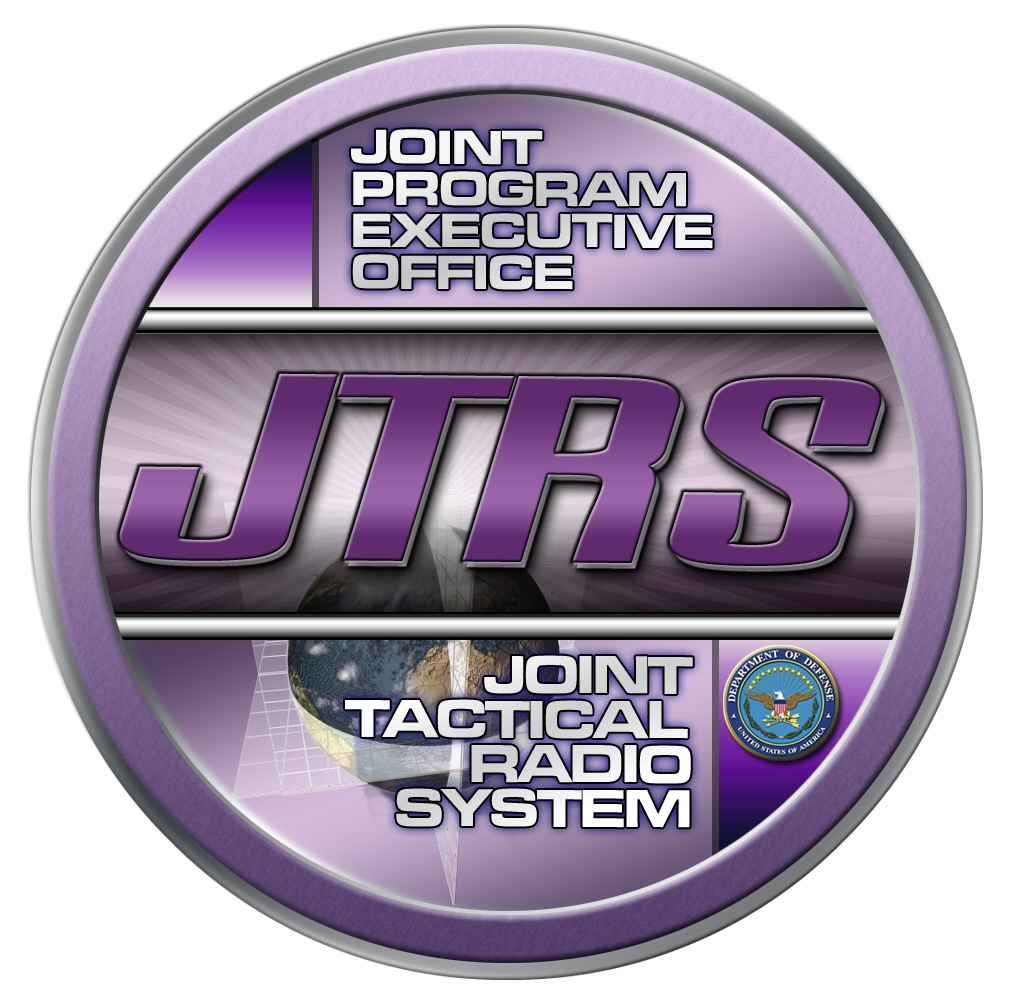

The Joint Tactical Radio System (JTRS) aimed to replace existing radios in the American military with a single set of software-defined radios that could have new frequencies and modes (“waveforms”) added via upload, instead of requiring multiple radio types in ground vehicles, and using circuit board swaps in order to upgrade. JTRS has seen cost overruns and full program restructurings, along with cancellation of some parts of the program.

JTRS HMS (Handheld, Manpack & Small Form-Fit (SFF)) radios are jointly developed and manufactured by Thales and General Dynamics Mission Systems. These software-defined radios are designed as successors to the JTRS-compatible CSCHR (Consolidated Single Channel Handheld Radios, ie. AN/PRC-148 and AN/PRC-152), securely transmitting voice and data simultaneously using Type 2 cryptography and the new Soldier Radio Waveform.

The Army announced in June 2015 a Request for Proposal (RFP) for full-rate production of the HMS program. Goal was set for assessment in 2015-2016 and for full rate production in 2017.

JTRS is widely seen as one of the DoD's greatest acquisition failures, having spent $6B over 15 years without delivering a radio.

== Overview ==
Launched with a Mission Needs Statement on August 21, 1997 and a subsequent Operational Requirements Document (ORD) on March 23, 1998 (which was revised several times), the original name was simply Joint Tactical Radio (JTR). This effort was led by the Joint Staff and was represented by all four Services. Each team member reported to their Service's chief information officer and reported back to the Joint Staff J6. The ORD started with 38 Threshold waveforms/radios and 4 Objective waveforms to support operations in three domain: Airborne, Maritime, and Ground Forces. Originally the JTR ORD do not address a software defined construct. The working group looked at the Navy's SPEAKeasy program as well as the USSOCOM sponsored Thales MultiBand Inter/Intra Team Radios. The JTR became Joint Tactical Radio System when the Navy took over as the acquisition executive agent. JTRS became a family of software-defined radios that were to work with many existing military and civilian radios. It included integrated encryption and Wideband Networking Software to create mobile ad hoc networks (MANETs).

The JTRS program was beset by delays and cost overruns, particularly Ground Mobile Radios (GMR), run by Boeing. Problems included a decentralized management structure, changing requirements, and unexpected technical difficulties that increased size and weight goals that made it harder to add the required waveforms.

The JTRS was built on the Software Communications Architecture (SCA), an open-architecture framework that tells designers how hardware and software are to operate in harmony. It governs the structure and operation of the JTRS, enabling programmable radios to load waveforms, run applications, and be networked into an integrated system. A Core Framework, providing a standard operating environment, must be implemented on every hardware set. Interoperability among radio sets was increased because the same waveform software can be easily ported to all radios.

The Object Management Group (OMG), a not-for-profit consortium that produces and maintains computer industry specifications for interoperable enterprise applications, is working toward building an international commercial standard based on the SCA.

== JTRS Program of Record ==
The Joint Tactical Radio System (JTRS) as a Program of Record evolved from a loosely associated group of radio replacement programs to an integrated effort to network multiple weapon system platforms and forward combat units where it matters most – at the last tactical mile. In 2005, JTRS was restructured under the leadership of a Joint Program Executive Officer (JPEO) headquartered in San Diego, California. The JPEO JTRS provides an enterprise acquisition and management approach to successfully and efficiently develop, produce, integrate, test and field the JTRS networking capability.

The JTRS Enterprise was composed of five ACAT 1D programs of record - Network Enterprise Domain (NED), Ground Mobile Radios (GMR), Handheld, Manpack, & Small Form Fit (HMS), Multifunctional Information Distribution System (MIDS) JTRS, and Airborne, Maritime Fixed/Station (AMF) and one ACAT III program - Handheld JTRS Enhanced Multi-Band Intra-Team Radio (JEM).

=== JTRS Network Enterprise Domain (NED) ===
JTRS NED was responsible for the development, sustainment, and enhancement of interoperable networking and legacy software waveforms. NED's product line consists of:

- 14 Legacy Waveforms
  - Bowman VHF
  - Collection Of Broadcasts From Remote Assets (COBRA)
  - Enhanced Position Location Reporting System (EPLRS)
  - HAVE QUICK II
  - High Frequency Single sideband / Automatic link establishment (HF SSB/ALE)
  - NATO Standardization Agreement 5066 (HF 5066)
  - Link 16
  - Single Channel Ground and Airborne Radio System (SINCGARS)
  - Ultra High Frequency Demand Assigned Multiple Access Satellite communications (UHF DAMA SATCOM) 181/182/183/184
  - Ultra High Frequency Line-of-Sight Communications System (UHF LOS)
  - Very High Frequency Line-of-Sight Communications System (VHF LOS)
- three Mobile Ad Hoc Networking Waveforms
  - Wideband Networking Waveform (WNW)
  - Soldier Radio Waveform (SRW)
  - Mobile User Objective System ([MUOS–Red Side Processing)
- Network Enterprise Services (NES) including
  - JTRS WNW Network Manager (JWNM)
  - Soldier Radio Waveform Network Manager (SRWNM)
  - JTRS Enterprise Network Manager (JENM)
  - Enterprise Network Services (ENS)

=== JTRS Ground Mobile Radios (GMR) ===
JTRS GMR are a key enabler of the DoD and Army Transformation and will provide critical communications capabilities across the full spectrum of Joint operations. Through software reconfiguration, JTRS GMR can emulate current force radios and operate new Internet Protocol (IP)-based networking waveforms offering increased data throughput utilizing self-forming, self-healing, and managed communication networks. The GMR route and retransmit functionality links various waveforms in different frequency bands to form one internetwork. GMR can scale from one to four channels supporting multiple security levels and effectively use the frequency spectrum within the 2 megahertz to 2 gigahertz frequency range. The radios are Software Communications Architecture compliant with increased bandwidth through future waveforms and are interoperable with 4+ current force radio systems and the JTRS family of radios.

Now that the GMR contract has been completed, the Army plans to leverage knowledge gained from the GMR Program in the upcoming Mid-Tier Networking Vehicular Radio solicitation.

=== JTRS Handheld, Manpack & Small Form Fit (HMS) ===
JTRS HMS is a materiel solution meeting the requirements of the Office of the Assistant Secretary of Defense for Networks and Information Integration/DoD Chief Information Officer for a Software Communications Architecture (SCA) compliant hardware system hosting SCA-compliant software waveforms (applications).

The JTRS HMS contract was structured to address Increment 1, consisting of Phases 1 and 2. Increment 1, Phase 1 was to develop the AN/PRC-154 Rifleman Radio sets and embedded SFF-A (one channel), SFF-A (two channel) and SFF-D (one channel) versions. The AN/PRC-154 Rifleman Radio sets and SFFs were to utilize the Soldier Radio Waveform (SRW) in a sensitive but unclassified environment (Type 2). In order to mitigate program waveform porting and integration challenges, the SRW application, which is managed by the JTRS Network Enterprise Domain, was developed on a Waveform Development Environment with HMS as the lead platform for porting.

Increment 1, Phase 2 was to develop the two channel manpack, two channel handheld, and embedded SFF-B, versions that are all Type 1 compliant for use in a classified environment. Waveforms on the phased sets include Ultra High Frequency (UHF) Satellite Communications, Soldier Radio Waveform (SRW), High Frequency (HF), Enhanced Position Location and Reporting System (EPLRS), Mobile-User Objective System (MUOS), and Single Channel Ground to Air Radio System (SINCGARS).

=== Multifunctional Information Distribution System (MIDS) JTRS ===
MIDS is a secure, scalable, modular, wireless, and jam-resistant digital information system currently providing Tactical Air Navigation (TACAN), Link-16, and J-Voice to airborne, ground, and maritime joint and coalition warfighting platforms. MIDS provides real-time and low-cost information and situational awareness via digital and voice, communications within the Joint Tactical Radio System (JTRS) Enterprise. The MIDS Program includes MIDS-LVT and the MIDS JTRS Terminal. MIDS-LVT is in full rate production and MIDS JTRS is in evolutionary development and limited production. MIDS JTRS is a “form fit function” replacement for MIDS–LVT and adds three additional channels for JTRS waveforms as required by joint and coalition warfighter.

=== JTRS Airborne & Maritime/Fixed Station (AMF) ===
AMF will provide a four-channel, full duplex, software-defined radio integrated into airborne, shipboard, and fixed-station platforms, enabling maritime and airborne forces to communicate seamlessly and with greater efficiency through implementation of five initial waveforms (i.e., Ultra-High Frequency Satellite Communications, Mobile User Objective System, Wideband Network Waveform, Soldier Radio Waveform, and Link 16) providing data, voice, and networking capabilities. JTRS AMF is software-reprogrammable, multi-band/multi-mode capable, mobile ad hoc network capable, and provides simultaneous voice, data, and video communications. The system is flexible enough to provide point-to-point and netted voice and data, whether it is between Service Command Centers, Shipboard Command Centers, Joint Operations Centers or other functional centers (e.g., intelligence, logistics, etc.). AMF will assist U.S. Armed Forces in the conduct of prompt, sustained, and synchronized operations, allowing warfighters the freedom to achieve information dominance in all domains; land, sea, air, space, and information.

== JTRS Product Delivery ==
=== JTRS Network Enterprise Domain (NED) ===
- Legacy waveform upgrades planned (VHF/UHF LOS, HQII, Bowman, EPLRS, Link 16)
- Networking waveforms/management completed FQT, in JTRS IR (WNW 4.0.2, SRW 1.01.1c, SRWNM 1.0R, JWNM v4.0 3); Interim versions in JTRS IR (SRWNM v1.0+, TTNT v6.0)
- Legacy waveforms completed FQT, in JTRS IR (VHF/UHF LOS, HQ II, COBRA, SATCOM 181/182/183/184, SINCGARS, EPLRS, JTRS Bowman, Link 16, HF)

=== JTRS Ground Mobile Radios (GMR) ===
- GMR LUT (3QFY11)
- System Integration Testing (Sept 2010)
- 91 sets for GMR DT/OT - 91 delivered
- PEO-I purchasing 153 EDMs through Boeing Prime/ Boeing GMR agreement for SDD, Test, and fielding to IBCT #1 – 30 Delivered for Test
- 121 GMR Pre-EDMs and 73 open chassis radios delivered for GMR/WF development & test; 71 pre-EDMs for E-IBCT SO1

The GMR contract was completed 31 March 2012.

=== JTRS Handheld, Manpack & Small Form Fit (HMS) ===
- MS C AN/PRC-154 (4QFY11); AN/PRC-155 (FY11/FY12); MUOS capable AN/PRC-155 (1QFY13)
- BCT Integration Exercise (July 2010)
- MUOS HPA PDR (July 2010)
- EDMs Delivered: 14 Manpacks (AN/PRC- 155); 21 JTRS Rifleman Radio (AN/PRC-154); 163 JTRS Rifleman Radio (AN/PRC-154) (CV1); 213 SFF A; 21 SFF-D

=== Multifunctional Information Distribution System (MIDS) JTRS ===
- IOC with F/A-18E/F (Jan 2011)
- Operational Test (Jul – Oct 2010); > 170 flight tests; >513 total flight test hours conducted on F/A-18E/F platform
- TRL 7 achieved (May/Jun 2010); Completed DT Flight Test (Apr 2010); NSA Certification (Mar 2010)
- MIDS JTRS Limited Production & Fielding Decision (Dec 2009) – 41 production terminals to support F/A-18E/F and JSTARS
- Delivered 7 terminals to F/A-18 for OT

=== JTRS Airborne & Maritime/Fixed Station (AMF) ===
- Delivered pre-production representative unit to AH-64D (Long Bow Apache) to support platform integration (Sep 2010)
- Completed Initial Hardware/Software Demonstration – Small Airborne (Aug 2010)
- Completed System CDR (Dec 2009)
- Air-to-Air-to-Ground SRW demonstration (Jun 2009)
- SDD contract awarded (Mar 2008)

=== Consolidated Single Channel Handheld Radios (CSCHR) ===
- Delivering over 150,000 radios and accessories to the Services

== Waveforms ==
JTRS was originally planned to use frequencies from 2 megahertz to 2 gigahertz. The addition of the Soldier Radio Waveform (SRW) waveform means the radios will also use frequencies above 2 GHz. Waveforms that were to be supported included:

- Soldier Radio Waveform (SRW)
- Single Channel Ground Air Radio System (SINCGARS) with Enhanced SINCGARS Improvement Program (ESIP), 30-88 MHz, FM, frequency hopping and single frequency
- HAVE QUICK II military aircraft radio, 225-400 MHz, AM, frequency hopping
- UHF SATCOM, 225-400 MHz, MIL-STD-188-181, -182, -183 and -184 protocols
- Mobile User Objective System (MUOS): The JTRS HMS manpack is the only radio program of record that will deliver terminals supporting the next generation UHF TACSAT MUOS program. 85% of all MUOS terminals are expected to be ground radios, so if JTRS HMS fails, MUOS (funded in the billions) fails as well - unless a COTS solution is developed. This is only true from the Army viewpoint, other services also use MUOS, not related to JTRS.
- Enhanced Position Location Reporting System (EPLRS), 420-450 MHz spread spectrum
- Wideband Networking Waveform (WNW) (under development)
- Link-4A, -11B, - 16, -22/TADIL tactical data links, 960-1215 MHz+
- VHF-AM civilian Air Traffic Control, 108-137 MHz, 25 (US) and 8.33 (European) kHz channels
- High Frequency (HF) - Independent sideband (ISB) with automatic link establishment (ALE), and HF Air Traffic Control (ATC), 1.5-30 MHz
- VHF/UHF-FM Land Mobile Radio (LMR), low-band 25-54 MHz, mid-band 72-76 MHz, high-band 136-175 MHz, 220-band 216-225 MHz, UHF/T 380-512 MHz, 800-band 764-869 MHz, TV-band 686-960 MHz, includes P25 public safety and homeland defense standard
- civilian marine VHF-FM radio, 156 MHz band
- Second generation Anti-jam Tactical UHF Radio for NATO (SATURN), 225-400 MHz PSK Anti-jam
- Identification Friend or Foe (IFF), includes Mark X & XII/A with Selective Identification Feature (SIF) and Air Traffic Control Radar Beacon System (ATCRBS), Airborne Collision Avoidance System (ACAS) and Traffic Alert & Collision Avoidance System (TCAS), and Automatic Dependent Surveillance – Addressable (ADS-A) and Broadcast (ADS-B) functionality, 1030 & 1090 MHz
- Digital Wideband Transmission System (DWTS) Shipboard system for high capacity secure & nonsecure, line-of-sight (LOS), ship-to-ship, and ship-to-shore, 1350-1850 MHz
- Soldier Radio & Wireless Local Area Network (WLAN), 1.755-1.850, 2.450-2.483.5 GHz, Army Land Warrior program 802.11
- Cellular telephone & PCS, includes multiple US and overseas standards and NSA/NIST Type 1 through 4 COMSEC (SCIP)
- Mobile Satellite Service (MSS), includes both VHF and UHF MSS bands and both fielded and emerging low Earth orbit and medium Earth orbit systems and standards, such as Iridium, Globalstar, et al. Includes capability for NSA/NIST Type 1 through 4 COMSEC, 1.61-2 [2.5] GHz. May allow use of geosynchronous satellites with special antenna.
- Integrated Broadcast Service Module (IBS-M). Currently three legacies UHF military broadcasts (TIBS, TDDS, and TRIXS) which will be replaced in the future with a Common Interactive Broadcast (CIB).
- BOWMAN, the UK Tri-Service HF, VHF and UHF tactical communications system.

Several of the above waveforms will not be supported in JTRS Increment 1 and have been deferred to "later increments". Currently, only Increment 1 is funded. The requirements document for JTRS Increment 2 is under development. JTRS Increment 1 threshold waveforms include:

Waveform/Applicable radios (based on JTRS ORD Amendment 3.2.1 dtd 28 Aug 06)

- SRW: Small Form Fit (SFF), Manpack, AMF-Small Airborne, Ground Mobile Radio
- WNW: Ground Mobile Radio, AMF-Small Airborne
- MUOS: AMF-Small Airborne, AMF-Maritime, Manpack (funding was recently added for the manpack)
- Link-16: AMF-Small Airborne, MIDS-J
- UHF SATCOM DAMA: Manpack, Ground Mobile Radio, AMF-Maritime
- SINCGARS ESIP with INC: Ground Mobile Radio
- SINCGARS ESIP: Handheld, SFF, Manpack, Ground Mobile Radio
- EPLRS: Handheld, SFF, Manpack, Ground Mobile Radio
- HF SSB/ISB w/ALE: Ground Mobile Radio
- HF SSB w/ALE: Manpack
- JAN-TE: MIDS-J

== Problems and restructuring ==
In March 2005, the JTRS program was restructured to add a Joint Program Executive Office, a unified management structure to coordinate development of the four radio versions.

In March 2006, the JPEO recommended changing the management structure, reducing the scope of the project, extending the deadline, and adding money. The JPEO's recommendations were accepted.

The program is focusing on the toughest part: transformational networking. The JTRS radio was to be a telephone, computer and router in one box that can transmit from 2 MHz to 2 GHz.

A September 2006 Government Accountability Office report said these changes had helped reduce the risk of more cost and schedule overruns to "moderate."

The U.S. military no longer plans to quickly replace all of its 750,000 tactical radios. The program is budgeted at $6.8 billion to produce 180,000 radios, an average cost per radio of $37,700. Program delays forced DOD to spend an estimated $11 billion to buy more existing tactical radios, such as the U.S. Marine Corps' Integrated, Intra-Squad Radio, the AN/PRC-117F and the AN/PRC-150.

On June 22, 2007, the Joint Program Executive Office issued the first JTRS-Approved radio (not JTRS-Certified) production contract. It gave Harris Corporation $2.7 billion and Thales Communications Inc. $3.5 billion for first-year procurement and allowed the firms to compete for more parts of the five-year program. Harris could make up to $7 billion; Thales, $9 billion.

In July 2008, the head of OSD AT&L conducted a 10-hour program review after costs continued to grow. Additionally, the JTRS Ground Mobile Radio program, originally funded at around $370 million, has now exceeded $1 billion despite reduced requirements.

In 2012, after the first 100 General Dynamics Manpack radios showed "poor reliability", the US Army placed a $250 million order for nearly four thousand more of them.

== History ==
- CONDOR (Command and Control on the Move Network, Digital Over the Horizon Relay)

During the Iraq War, the USMC developed their own system using commercial off the shelf technology, combining satcoms with wifi, that has worked ever since.

- Ground Mobile Radios
  - GMR - formerly Cluster 1, run by the Army, was to equip Marine and Army ground vehicles, Air Force Tactical Air Control Parties (TACPs), and Army helicopters. Cluster 1 also included the development of a Wideband Networking Waveform (WNW), a next-generation IP-based waveform designed to allow mobile ad hoc networking (MANET). In 2005, the cluster was renamed Ground Mobile Radios (GMR) with the Air Force TACP and Army helicopter radios deleted.
- Handeheld Manpack & Small Form Fit
  - HMS - formally Cluster 5, led by the Army, developed handheld, man-portable, and smaller radios. In 2006, it was renamed HMS, for Handheld, Manpack, and Small Form Factor.
- Airborne & Maritime/Fixed Station
  - AMF - formerly Clusters 3 and 4: Cluster 3 aimed to develop a maritime / fixed radio. It was led by the Navy and grew out of the Navy's previous Digital Modular Radio program. Cluster 4, led by the Air Force, aimed to provide radios to Air Force and Navy fixed-wing aircraft and helicopters. In 2004, Clusters 3 and 4 were combined into the Airborne and Maritime / Fixed-Station program. In 2006, the Army helicopter radio was added to this cluster. In early 2008, JTRS AMF attained Milestone B after it received an additional $700 million. Cost estimates conducted by OSD's CAIG determined that the original amount, just over $500 million, was too little. On March 28, 2008, Lockheed Martin announced that the JTRS Joint Program Executive Office picked it to design and provide tactical communications and networking gear for the Air Force, Army, Navy and other users. The initial System Development and Demonstration (SDD) contract value is $766 million. Subcontractors will include BAE Systems, General Dynamics, Northrop Grumman, and Raytheon. Work will be conducted at Scottsdale, Ariz.; San Diego, Calif.; Tampa, Fla.; Fort Wayne, Ind.; Gaithersburg, Md.; St. Paul, Minn.; Wayne, N.J.; Charleston, S.C.; and Chantilly and Reston, Va.
- MIDS JTRS - In 2006, the JTRS program took over the effort to improve the Multifunctional Information Distribution System Low Volume Terminal (MIDS-LVT) design, which was developed by a 5-nation consortium in the 1990s. This program was renamed MIDS-JTRS and also experienced cost growth and delays.
- Special Radios
  - JEM. - formally Cluster 2, was renamed the JTRS JEM program, adds JTRS capability to the existing handheld AN/PRC-148 Multiband Inter/Intra Team Radio (MBITR) to create the JTRS Enhanced MBITR (JEM). Led by U.S. Special Operations Command, the development effort has certified and fielded the radio.
- Joint Tactical Networking Center (JTNC) and Joint Tactical Networks (JTN) - July 2012..

== See also ==
- Global Information Grid
- Joint Electronics Type Designation System – Unclassified designation system for United States military electronic equipment

=== Lists ===
- List of military electronics of the United States
- List of equipment of the United States Armed Forces
- List of radios#Military radios
