= AN/PRC-154 =

US military handheld intra-squad tactical radio

AN/PRC-154
noframe
Type	Handheld tactical radio
Service History
In service	2012-
Used by	United States Army
Production history
Manufacturer	General Dynamics Thales
Production years	2011-
Number produced	>21,000
Specifications
Frequency range	UHF: 225-450MHz, L-Band: 1250-1390MHz, 1755-1850MHz
Transmit power	up to 5 watts
Modes	digital voice, digital data
Encryption	154: NSA Type 2 (unclassified) 154A: NSA Type 1 (up to Secret)
Battery life	>9 hrs

The AN/PRC-154 Rifleman Radio is a handheld, intra-squad tactical radio used by the U.S. Army. It is intended to be employed by all members of a rifle squad not traditionally equipped with their own radio, thus enabling team and squad leaders to communicate with their subordinates from a distance. The 154 is capable of both voice and data traffic and is compatible with the Nett Warrior device for transmitting text messages, reports, and imagery.

In accordance with the Joint Electronics Type Designation System (JETDS), the "AN/PRC-154" designation represents the 154th design of an Army-Navy electronic device for portable two-way communications radio. The JETDS system also now is used to name all Department of Defense electronic systems.

== Service history ==
The US Army has received over 21,000 PRC-154's as of 2014. The PRC-154 was first used in combat by the 75th Ranger Regiment in 2011.

== Specifications ==
=== General ===
- Frequency range: UHF: 225-450 MHz, L-Band: 1250-1390 MHz, 1755-1850 MHz
- Transmit power: selectable, up to 5 W
- Modes: digital voice, digital data
- Waveforms: Soldier Radio Waveform (SRW)
- Encryption: NSA Type 1 algorithms (154A model), NSA Type 2 algorithms (154 model)
- GPS: Internal, optional external antenna
- Programmable channels: 50
- Weight: 1.7lbs w/ battery
- Communication range: >2km (ideal conditions)

=== Interfaces ===
- UHF Transceiver antenna: TNC female, 50Ω characteristic impedance
- External GPS antenna: SMA male
- External audio and COMSEC keyfill connector: U-283 6-pin
- Side connector for external control, programming, and connection to an End User Device via USB or RS-232

=== Environmental ===
- Operating temperature: -40 to +55 °C
- Storage temperature: -51 to +71 °C
- Immersion: 2 m

== See also ==
- Joint Tactical Radio System
- List of military electronics of the United States
