= AN/PRC-150 =

American military radio system

AN/PRC-150
Type	Manpack tactical radio
Service History
Used by	United States Army, US Marines
Conflicts	Iraq War, War in Afghanistan, Operation Inherent Resolve
Production history
Manufacturer	L3Harris
Specifications
Frequency range	1.6-60 MHz
Transmit power	up to 20 watts
Modes	FM (VHF), AM, AME, SSB, CW
Encryption	NSA Type 1 algorithms (Top Secret and below)

The AN/PRC-150(C) Falcon II Manpack Radio, is a tactical HF-SSB/ VHF-FM manpack radio manufactured by Harris Corporation. It holds an NSA certification for Type 1 encryption. The PRC-150 is the manpack HF radio for the Harris Falcon II family of radios, introduced in the early 2000s.

In accordance with the Joint Electronics Type Designation System (JETDS), the "AN/PRC-150" designation represents the 150th design of an Army-Navy electronic device for portable two-way communications radio. The JETDS system also now is used to name all Department of Defense electronic systems.

== Users ==
The AN/PRC-150(C) radio is currently in use with the United States Army, United States Special Operations Command as well as within the US Marine Corps and United States Air Force.

The PRC-150 is particularly popular for use in dismounted reconnaissance units, such as the US Army's Long Range Surveillance units (now deactivated), IBCT Dismounted Reconnaissance Troops (DRT) and IBCT Infantry battalion scout platoons. This is due to the fact that the PRC-150 can achieve Beyond Line-Of-Sight (BLOS) communications over 1500 km away in a radio/antenna package that can fit inside an assault pack. When used with a tactical laptop, such as a Panasonic Toughbook, the PRC-150 can be used as an HF IP data modem for text messaging, email, and multimedia file sharing, important for transmitting reports and photographic imagery collected by a recon unit.

It is being phased out in favor of the newer AN/PRC-160, the manpack HF radio for the Harris Falcon III family of radios. The PRC-160 is lighter and smaller than the PRC-150, and is capable of 4th Generation Automatic Link Establishment (4G ALE) and up to 10x faster data speeds.

== Specifications ==
AN/PRC-150

=== General ===
- Frequency Range: 1.6 to 59.999 MHz
- Net Presets: 75, fully programmable
- Frequency Stability ±0.5 × 10^{–6}
- Emission Modes: J3E (single sideband, upper or lower, suppressed carrier telephony), H3E (compatible AM single sideband plus full carrier), A1A, J2A (compatible CW), selectable; F3E (FM)
- RF Input/Output Impedance: 50 Ω nominal, unbalanced
- Power Input: 26 VDC (21.5 to 32 VDC)
- Data Interface: Synchronous or asynchronous (RS-232C; MIL-STD-188-114A)
- Dimensions (with battery case): 10.5W × 3.5H × 13.2D inches (26.7W × 8.1H × 34.3D cm)
- Radio Weight: 10 lb (4.7 kg) without batteries.
- Model: RT-1694D (P)(C)/U

=== Receiver ===
- Sensitivity SSB: –113 dBm (0.5 μV) minimum for 10 dB SINAD
- Audio Output: 15 mW at 1000 Ω to external handset
- Squelch: Front panel adjustable, active squelch selectable
- IF Rejection: Greater than 80 dB
- Image Rejection: Greater than 80 dB (First IF image)
- Intermodulation Distortion: –80 dB or better for two –30-dBm signals separated 30 kHz or more
- Overload Protection: Receiver protected to 32 VRMS

=== Transmitter ===
- Power Output: 1, 5, 20 watts PEP/Average -1/+2 dB (1, 5, 10 watts FM)
- Audio Input: 1.5 mV at 150 Ω or 0 dBm at 600 Ω for full rated output
- Carrier Suppression: Greater than 60 dB below PEP output (J3E mode)
- Undesired Sideband Suppression: Greater than 60 dB below PEP output
- Spurious Outputs: –50 dB relative to rated output, except harmonics which are –40 dB (Greater than 20 kHz from Fc) Minimum for fo = 1.6-30 MHz
- Antenna Tuning Capability: OE-505 10-foot (3 m) whip (1.6 to 60 MHz), RF-1936P (AS-2259) NVIS (1.6 to 30 MHz), RF-1940-AT001/RF-1941 dipole

=== Environmental ===
- Test Method: Per MIL-STD-810E
- Immersion: 3 ft. (0.9 m) of water
- Operating temperature: −40 °C to +70 °C

=== HF Features ===
- Encrypted Data HF: MIL-STD-188-110B App. C (9600 bit/s and 12,800 bit/s uncoded), App. B 39 tone (to 2400 bit/s), Serial Tone (to 9600 bit/s), STANAG 4285 (2400 bit/s), STANAG 4415 (75 bit/s), STANAG 4539 (9600 bit/s), FSK (600 bit/s)
- VHF: FSK (16 kbit/s)
- Automatic Link Establishment (ALE): STANAG 4538 FLSU, MIL-STD-188-141B Appendix A with Appendix B AL-1 LP, including the Scope Command telephony call type
- Frequency hopping: Serial Tone ECCM
- Vocoder: HF LPC-10-52E (600/2400) MELP (600/2400), VHF: CVSD
- Data Link Layer Protocol (ARQ): STANAG 4538 (3G), pFED-STD-1052

=== VHF Features ===
- Data: Wideband FSK (16 kbit/s)
- Voice Digitization: CVSD (16 kbit/s)

=== COMSEC Interoperability ===
ANDVT/KY-99, ANDVT/KY-100, KG-84C, KY-57 VINSON (VHF), CITADEL (NSA approved exportable COMSEC)

== See also ==
- AN/PRC-117F
- AN/PRC-148
- AN/PRC-152
- AN/PRC-160
- List of military electronics of the United States
