= Army Nomenclature System =

Naming system for US Army items

The Army Nomenclature System is a nomenclature system used by the US Army for giving type designations to its materiel. It is based on MIL-STD-1464A which was released in 1981 and most recently revised on February 22, 2021.

== Usage ==
The Army Nomenclature System is designed to help accurately reference specific items which may have similar names to other items of their category. It applies to:

- Weapons
- Ammunition
- Vehicles
- Explosives
- System components
- Other equipment associated with handling/storage/management of the above

It is not utilized if one of the following nomenclature systems can designate the item:

- MIL-STD-196: Joint Electronics Type Designation System
- MIL-STD-1812: Aeronautical and Support Equipment Type Designation System
- AFR 82-1/AR 70-50/NAVMATINST 8800.4A: Joint Regulation Designating and Naming Military Aerospace Vehicles (concerning United States military aircraft designation systems)
- MIL-STD-1661 Mark and Mod Nomenclature System (used by US Navy)

== Application ==
The complete nomenclature consists of an Approved Item Name (AIN), an extended modifier (if applicable), and the type designation. The AIN is presented in all capital letters, is not abbreviated, and is followed by a colon. Each AIN has a corresponding 6-digit Item Name Code (INC) which can be referenced in the H6 Cataloging Handbook. The extended modifier is in lower case and may contain abbreviations (which are capitalized). The type designation does not use any spaces or hyphens (so "M-16" and "M 16" are incorrect). An example given is "PROJECTILE, 105 MILLIMETER: HE, rocket assisted, M547A3". The Approved Item Name is "PROJECTILE, 105 MILLIMETER"; the extended modifier(s) "HE, rocket assisted", and the type designation is "M547A3".

The type designation may not be unique to that specific item and, thus, may not accurately identify an item if the Approved Item Name and Extended Modifier are not included. For example, the type designation M1 is used in the M1 Carbine as well as the M1 Abrams tank, however, the former is specified as "CARBINE, CALIBER .30, M1" while the latter is specified as "TANK, COMBAT, FULL TRACKED: 105-MM Gun, M1".

The type designation is rendered as a prefix letter(s) followed by a number, possibly followed by a letter-number suffix to denote various versions.

| Prefix letter(s) | Meaning | Example |
|---|---|---|
| XM | Experimental (in development or limited production) | CARTRIDGE, 120 MILLIMETER: HE, Guided, XM395 |
| M | Type Classified Standard (TC-STD) | MACHINE GUN, 5.56 MILLIMETER, M249 |

Letter-Number suffix
| Letter portion | Meaning | Examples |
|---|---|---|
| A | Successive approved modifications (A1, A2, A3, etc.) | TANK, COMBAT, FULL-TRACKED: 120 MM GUN M1A1 |
| E | Experimental modification versions (E1, E2, E3, etc.) | CARTRIDGE, 40 MILLIMETER: Practice, Target, Day, Night, Thermal, High velocity, M918E1 |

== See also ==
- Standardization
- List of equipment of the United States Army
