= Integrated Tactical Network =

US Army network concept

This material was split from Army Futures Command

The US Army's Integrated Tactical Network (ITN) "is not a new or separate network but rather a concept"—PEO C3T. (Note: When developing a complex product such as a network, it is helpful to develop piecewise, to avoid the 'zero defects mentality' ("But if you fail, we'd like you to fail early and fail cheap,' because progress and success often builds on failure." —Ryan McCarthy)) Avoid overspecifying the requirements for Integrated Tactical Network Information Systems Initial Capabilities Document. Instead, meet operational needs, such as interoperability with other networks, and release ITN capabilities incrementally.

- Up through 2028, every two years the Army will insert new capability sets for ITN (Capability sets '21, '23, '25, etc.). and take feedback from Soldier-led experiment & evaluation. However, the Army's commitment to a 'campaign of learning' showed more paths:
  - Firestorm was made possible by a mesh network—improvising an MEO, and then a GEO satellite link between JBLM to YPG. There are plans to have a Project Convergence 2021. The Army fielded a data fabric at Project Convergence 2020; this will eventually be part of JADC2.
  - Five Rapid Innovation Fund (RIF) awards were granted to five vendors via the Network CFT and PEO C3T's request for white papers. That request, for a roll-on/roll-off kit that integrates all functions of mission command on the Army Network, was posted at the National Spectrum Consortium and FedBizOpps, and yielded awards within eight months. (Note: Sydney J. Freedberg Jr. Army Applications Lab: (23 October 2018) Army Futures Command Wants YOU (To Innovate): —Adam Jay Harrison's list for types of Funding Authority) Two more awards are forthcoming.
  - The Rapid Capabilities Office (RCO)'s Emerging Technologies Office structured a competition to find superior AI/Machine Learning algorithms for electronic warfare, from a field of 150 contestants, over a three-month period.
  - The Multi-Domain Operations Task Force (MDO TF) is standing up an experimental Electronic Warfare Platoon to prototype an estimated 1000 EW soldiers needed for the 31 BCTs of the active Army.
- Capability Set '21 fields ITN to selected infantry brigades to prepare for IVAS Integrated vision goggles. Expeditionary signal brigades get enhanced satellite communications.
  - 1/82nd Airborne, 173rd Airborne, 3/25th ID, and 3/82nd Airborne infantry brigades will all have fielded the Integrated Tactical Network Capability Set '21 by year-end 2021. 2nd Cavalry Regiment is getting Capability Set '21 on Strykers, which will test the CS'23 network design on Strykers early.
- Integrated Tactical Network (ITN) Capability Set '23 is prototyping JADC2 communications and the data fabric, to LEO (low Earth orbit) and to MEO (medium Earth orbit) satellites, as continued in Project Convergence 2021 in Yuma Proving Ground. Capability Set '23 has passed its Critical design review (CDR). (Note: The Senate Appropriations Committee is cutting an Army component of the FY23 Presidential Budget Request which funds a CS'23 network capability.)
- Integrated Tactical Network (ITN) Capability Set '25 will implement JADC2, according to the acting head of the Network CFT.
- Integrated Tactical Network (ITN) Capability Set '27 design goals are being laid out.

- G-6 John Morrison is seeking to unify the battlefield networks of ITN, and IEN (Enterprise Network), as of September 2021.
  - An Army leader dashboard from PEO Enterprise Information Systems is underway. The dashboard is renamed Vantage. The dashboard has streamlined and connected data updates for deployments. Vantage is to be replaced by Army Data Platform 2.0, using multiple vendors. Cloud-service-provider agnostic abstraction layers are in use, which allows merging the staff work in G-3/5/7 for cyber/EW (electronic warfare), mission command, and space. The "seamless, real-time flow of data" across multiple domains (land, sea, air, space, and cyberspace) is an objective for G-6, as well as the sensor-to-shooter work at Futures command.
  - Fort Irwin, Fort Hood, Joint Base San Antonio, and Joint Base Lewis McChord have 5G experiments on wireless connectivity between forward operating bases and tactical operations centers, as well as nonaircraft Augmented reality support of maintenance and training.
  - The Multi-domain task forces (MDTFs) will be used to expose any capability gaps in the Unified network plan.

DISA is providing network services in preparation for JADC2, to USINDOPACOM.
