= AN/PRC-113 =

American military VHF/UHF radio transceiver

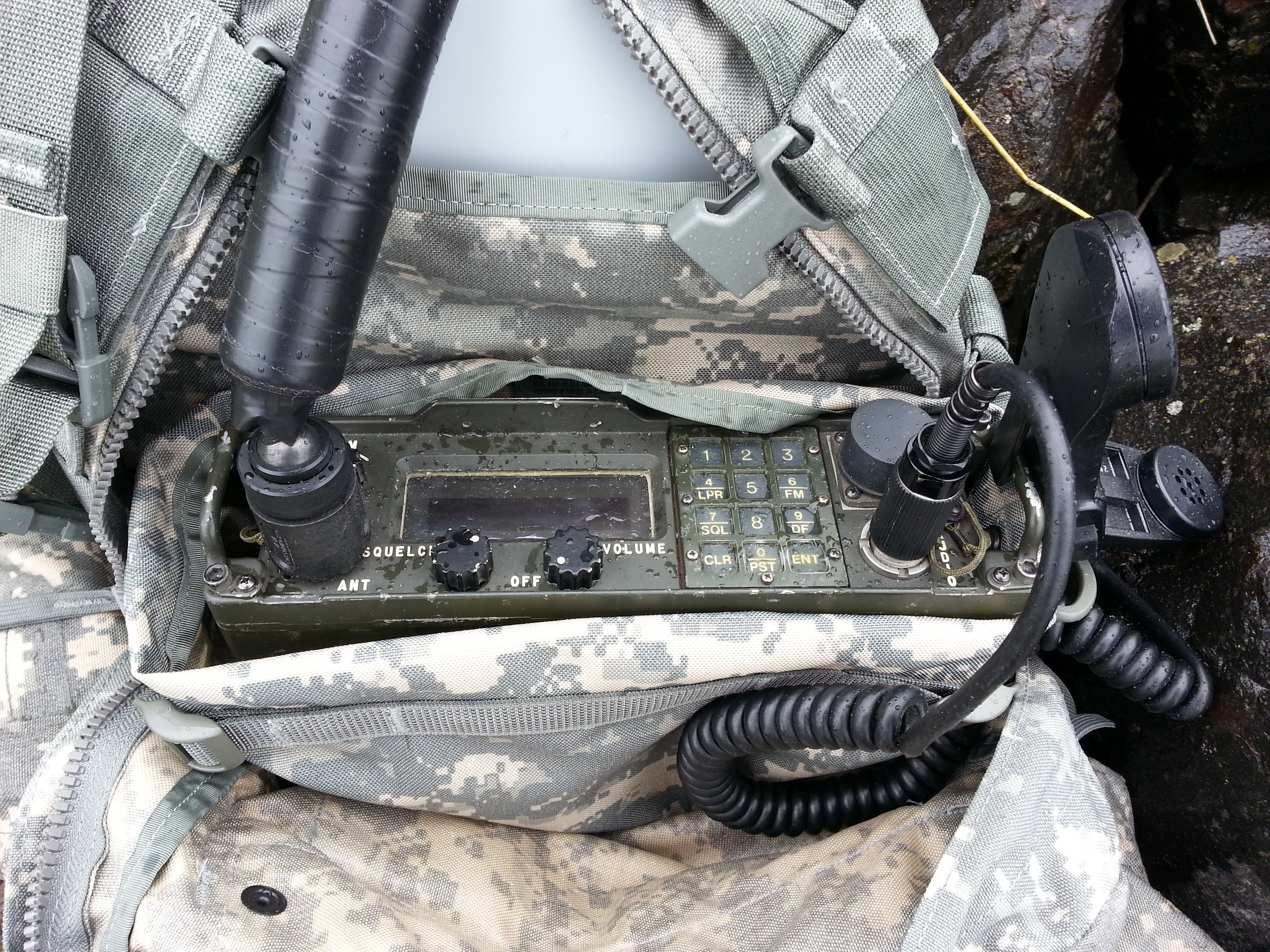
AN/PRC 113 radio using the RT-1319 transceiver with the H-250 Handmic in a UCP MOLLE II assault pack and radio pouch.

AN/PRC 113 Radio Set is a manpack, portable VHF and UHF AM combat radio transceiver manufactured by Magnavox America.

In accordance with the Joint Electronics Type Designation System (JETDS), the "AN/PRC-113" designation represents the 113th design of an Army-Navy electronic device for portable two-way communications radio. The JETDS system also now is used to name all Department of Defense electronic systems.

== History ==
The AN/PRC-113 is a tactical, short range, manpack, ground to air / air to ground / ground to ground radio used primarily by Forward Air Controller (FAC) teams, Forward Observers (FO) and Marine Air Command and Control agencies. It was also used by some units in the active army, national guard and reserves, but mostly by support elements. It was first introduced by the Magnavox Corporation in 1986 and was quickly well liked by ground troops because of its simplicity and ease of use.

== Technical characteristics ==
The AN/PRC 113 consists of the RT-1319 transceiver and minor components. It can provide secure voice communications with the external TSEC/KY-57 device and is compatible with the HAVEQUICK II frequency hopping mode. It is a radio designed to allow ground forces to communicate with aircraft on either the VHF AM aircraft band (116.000 to 149.975 MHz) or the UHF AM aircraft band (225.000 to 399.975 MHz) in 25 kHz steps. Some versions also have FM capabilities that allows communications on the same frequency range in FM mode. Its first use was for the GRC-206 Program Pacer Speak used by Forward Air Controllers (FAC).

All AN/PRC-113s contain a "Guard Receiver" tuned to the military rescue/survival frequency of 243 MHz but not to the civilian counterpart frequency of 121.5 MHz. These radios have been phased out and replaced by the newer manpack ASIP and AN/PRC-148 MBITR radios that cover everything between 2 and 512 MHz.

Manufacturer Datasheet
Channels:	8360, including 8 Preset & 1 Guard Channel.
Frequency Ranges:	VHF: 116 TO 149.975 MHz; UHF: 225 TO 399.975 MHz
Estimated Range:	5–20 km (3.1–12.4 mi) Dependent on conditions. This is the approximate range when not connected to a repeater or a network.
Power Output:	2W to 10W
Power Source:	BA-5590/U non-rechargeable or BB-2590/U and UBI-2590 rechargeable batteries.
Antenna:	These units use the MPMP100X4 antenna (NSN 5985-01-184-0035).
Type of Service:	Line of sight combat Manpack field radio.
Weight:	13.8 lbs w/o batteries, 16.7 lbs w/batteries.
Operating temperature:	−29 °C (−20 °F) to 68 °C (154 °F).
MIL-STD:	Exceeds MIL-STD-810G, MIL-STD-461F, MIL-STD-188-141B, MIL-STD-188-181B
Note:	A modified version of the AN/PRC-113 is available with FM modulation and is designated the MXF-711-3C. This version has been enhanced to allow a communication using FM in addition to AM modulation.

== Users ==
Users include the Royal Air Force, Royal Australian Air Force, Royal New Zealand Air Force, US Military, US Army Green Berets, US Army Rangers, US Army Night Stalkers, USMC MAGTF, US Navy/USMC VBSS teams, US Navy SEAL teams, US Navy/Army/Air Force EOD units, US Air Force TACP and JTAC.

== See also ==
- List of military electronics of the United States
