= 2-hydroxy-6-oxo-6-(2-aminophenyl)hexa-2,4-dienoate hydrolase =

Class of enzymes

Identifiers
- EC no.: 3.7.1.13

Databases
- IntEnz: IntEnz view
- BRENDA: BRENDA entry
- ExPASy: NiceZyme view
- KEGG: KEGG entry
- MetaCyc: metabolic pathway
- PRIAM: profile
- PDB structures: RCSB PDB PDBe PDBsum
Search
- PMC: articles
- PubMed: articles
- NCBI: proteins

2-hydroxy-6-oxo-6-(2-aminophenyl)hexa-2,4-dienoate hydrolase (EC 3.7.1.13, CarC) is an enzyme with systematic name (2E,4E)-6-(2-aminophenyl)-2-hydroxy-6-oxohexa-2,4-dienoate acylhydrolase. This enzyme catalyses the following chemical reaction

(2E,4E)-6-(2-aminophenyl)-2-hydroxy-6-oxohexa-2,4-dienoate + H_{2}O $\rightleftharpoons$ anthranilate + (2E)-2-hydroxypenta-2,4-dienoate

This enzyme catalyses the third step in the aerobic degradation pathway of carbazole.
