= FASCINATOR =

Type 1 encryption module series

FASCINATOR is a series of Type 1 encryption modules designed in the late-1980s to be installed in Motorola SECURENET-capable voice radios. These radios were originally built to accept a proprietary Digital Voice Protection (DVP) or a DES-based encryption module that was not approved by NSA for classified communications. The FASCINATOR modules replaced the standard modules and can be used for classified conversations at all levels when used with appropriately classified keys. FASCINATOR operates at 12 kbit/s for encryption and decryption. It is not compatible with other encryption schema.

NSA originally supplied keys for FASCINATOR on paper tape for loading using KOI-18 or KYK-13 fill devices and a special adaptor box and cable. The standard cryptoperiod was 7 days, i.e. keys had to be changed weekly.

FASCINATOR was adopted by the U.S government as Federal Standard 1023, which establishes interoperability requirements regarding the analog to digital conversion, encryption (with related synchronization), and modulation of encrypted voice associated with frequency modulation (FM) radio systems employing 25 kHz channels and operating above 30 MHz. Voice is digitized using 12 kbit/s continuously variable slope delta modulation (CVSD) and then encrypted using a National Security Agency (NSA) Commercial COMSEC Endorsement Program (CCEP) Type 1 encryption algorithm based on the KY-57/58.

== Sources ==
- Operational Security Policy for Communications Equipment with FASCINATOR, US Marine Corps order 2231.2, 1989
- FED-STD 1023 Telecommunications: Interoperability Requirements For Encrypted, Digitized Voice Utilized With 25 kHz Channel FM Radios Operating Above 30 MHz
