= AN/PRC-153 =

Two-way radio system

AN/PRC-153
A US Marine infantry team leader with a PRC-153 during a patrol in Afghanistan
| Type | Handheld tactical radio |
Service History
| In service | 2006 - |
| Used by | US Marines |
| Conflicts | Iraq War, War in Afghanistan, Operation Inherent Resolve |
Production history
| Manufacturer | Motorola Solutions |
| Produced | 2006–2014 |
| Number built | Over 60,000 |
Specifications
| Frequency range | 380–470 MHz (UHF R1) |
| Transmit power | up to 5 watts |
| Modes | analog and digital voice, digital data (text messaging) |
| Encryption | Advanced Encryption Standard, Data Encryption Standard |

The AN/PRC-153 is the Joint Electronics Type Designation System (JETDS) designation for the US military version of the Motorola XTS-2500i secure handheld 2-way radio, known as the Integrated, Intra-Squad Radio (IISR) within the US Marine Corps. Its intended purpose is squad-level communications during urban warfare. The USMC ordered 60,000 radios to be used until replaced by the more complex Joint Tactical Radio System (JTRS) cluster 5 spiral 2 radio in 2013. However, JTRS was cancelled in October 2011, and thus the PRC-153 continues to serve. The IISR is a Motorola XTS 2500i with embedded encryption module to provide secure voice communications. The embedded encryption module is identical to that of the commercially available XTS 2500 modules, and supports DES and AES encryption algorithms. As such, it is not classified as a Controlled Cryptographic Item (CCI).

In accordance with JETDS, the "AN/PRC-153" designation represents the 153rd design of an Army-Navy electronic device for portable two-way radio. The JETDS system also now is used to name all Department of Defense electronic systems.

== Specifications ==
Sources:

- Frequency range: 380–470 MHz (UHF R1)
- Power output: 2.5–5 watts
- Antenna: omnidirectional, flexible monopole antenna mounted to radio body with SMA connector. 50Ω characteristic impedance.
- Transmission Range: up to 5 miles on flat terrain, 1 mile with obstacles
- Channels: 240 channels total, 12.5 or 25 kHz channel bandwidth
- Operating modes: Analog voice (unencrypted only), IMBE digital voice (encrypted and unencrypted), digital text messaging
- Programming: Windows PC-based Customer Programming Software via RS-232 or USB cable (all models), Front Panel Programming (FPP) (Model III only)
- Encryption: Internal Type II COMSEC supporting AES, DES, DVP, ADP algorithms
- Encryption key fill: CPS for software-based 40-bit ADP encryption, Key Variable Loader (KVL) for hardware-based algorithms such as AES, DES, etc.
- Weight: 11 oz (transceiver only), 19.85 oz with NiCD (Nickel-Cadmium) battery
- Dimensions: 6.00" x 2.30" x 1.50" (w/o battery or antenna)
- Environmental exposure certifications: MIL-STD-810 C, D, E, F and IP67 ratings.

== See also ==
- List of military electronics of the United States
