= Demand Assigned Multiple Access =

Demand Assigned Multiple Access (DAMA) is a technology used to assign a channel to clients that do not need to use it constantly. DAMA systems assign communication channels based on news issued from user terminals to a network security system. When the circuit is no longer in use, the channels are again returned to the central pool for reassignment to other users.

Channels are typically a pair of carrier frequencies (one for transmit and one for receive), but can be other fixed bandwidth resources such as timeslots in a TDMA burst plan or even physical party line channels. Once a channel is allocated to a given pair of nodes, it is not available to other users in the network until their session is finished.

It allows utilizing of one channel (radio or baseband frequency, timeslot, etc.) by many users sequentially at different times. This technology is mainly useful with sparsely used networks of transient clients, as opposed to PAMA (Permanently Assigned Multiple Access). By using DAMA technology the number of separate nodes that can use a limited pool of circuits can be greatly increased at the expense of no longer being able to provide simultaneous access for all possible pairs of nodes. A five-channel DAMA network can only have five simultaneous conversations but could have any number of nodes. A five-channel PAMA network permanently supports five simultaneous conversations, with channel ownership remaining with their permanently assigned nodes even when idle.

DAMA and PAMA are related only to channel/resource allocation and should not be confused with the multiple access/multiplexing methods (such as FDMA frequencies, TDMA slots, CDMA codes, or others) intended to divide a single communication channel into multiple virtual channels. These systems typically use resource allocation protocols that allow a more rapid (although often less deterministic, consider CDMA collisions) near-real-time allocation of bandwidth based on demand and data priority. However, in sparsely allocated multiple-access channels, DAMA can be used to allocate the individual virtual channel resources provided by the multiple-access channel. This is most common in environments that are sufficiently sparsely utilized that there is no need to add complexity just to recover "conversation gap" idle periods.

DAMA is widely used in satellite communications, especially in VSAT systems. It is very effective in environments comprising multiple users each having a low to moderate usage profile.

DAMA is often used in military environments due to the relative simplicity of implementation, ease of modeling, and the fact that military usage profiles are a very good fit. In military SATCOM, it has the added advantage that it can function in a bent pipe environment, thus requires no special security or coordination hardware on the satellite. This allows the master and slave ground stations to be upgraded repeatedly to change or improve security and compression without requiring an expensive satellite replacement.
