= Chemical Agent Resistant Coating =

Paint commonly applied to military vehicles

Chemical Agent Resistant Coating (CARC) is a paint commonly applied to military vehicles to provide protection against chemical and biological weapons.

The surface of the paint is engineered to be easily decontaminated after exposure to chemical warfare and biological warfare agents. The paint is also resistant to damage and removal by decontaminating solutions. Two-component systems (e.g. epoxy or polyester-based) are often employed. This coating is described in MIL-DTL-53072H.

== Background ==
As of 2018, the U.S. Army Research Laboratory (ARL) led research and development activity for CARC and was the approving authority of CARC products for the Department of Defense (DoD).

Since 1985, U.S. Army Regulation 750-1 mandated the use of CARC systems on all tactical equipment. Regulations mandated the hardening of equipment (i.e. ground support equipment, tactical wheeled vehicles, and aircraft) against the impacts of chemical attacks and subsequent cleaning agents following contamination. These same regulations were followed by the Marine Corps and Air Force.

== Applications ==
As of 1985, most military vehicles and equipment have a topcoat applied with camouflaged CARCs. These topcoats produced a non-porous finish that acted as a protectant against radioactive, biological and chemical contamination. CARC repelled chemical by preventing absorption, with chemicals beading up on the finish surface where they could be washed away.

CARC coatings were also used by government contractors who refurbish vehicles and parts for the U.S. military. Examples included Light Armored Vehicles (LAVs), High Mobility Multi-Purpose Wheeled Vehicles (HMMWV), generators, containers and shelter exteriors.

Solvent-borne CARCs were developed in the early 1980s. The impetus for CARC development was the need to protect costly military equipment. Operation Desert Storm further increased concern of the potential for chemical attacks.

Since 2000, high-performance water-reducible CARCs were commonly used. These materials met DoD’s VOC objective of 1.8 lb/gal and contained no hazardous air pollutants.

== Description ==
The impetus for improved CARC formulations was to reduce the cost of material degradation for the DoD. An improved topcoat was composed to have 44% primary pigments and inorganic extenders, 24% resins, 30% solvent, and 2% additives. Formulations changed from inorganic to polymeric-based extenders in order to enhance the protective features of the topcoat and reduce the cost of material degradation. Additionally, air pollution regulations required reformulation of the coating’s solvent content to reduce the emission of hazardous air pollutants.

== Design ==
As of 2000, two different CARC topcoats included:

1) One-component, moisture-cure urethane (MCU): MCU CARCs cured in a two-stage process where water and isocyanate groups combined to produce a cured paint film. The materials were designed for resistance to windblown dust, sand and chemical agents. An improvement to solvent-borne polyurethanes, MCU materials offered both lower levels of volatile organic compounds and elimination of hazardous air pollutants.

2) Two-component, high-performance, water-reducible polyurethane: Waterbased CARCs, most commonly used by the military, were composed of water-reducible polyurethane resins, marking the first time a water-based two-component CARC was commercially available. This formulation eliminated several solvents, including methyl isobutyl ketone, toluene and xylene.
