= Joint Electronics Type Designation System =

Unclassified designation system for United States military electronic equipment

The Joint Electronics Type Designation System (JETDS), which was previously known as the Joint Army-Navy Nomenclature System (AN System. JAN) and the Joint Communications-Electronics Nomenclature System, is a method developed by the U.S. War Department during World War II for assigning an unclassified designator to electronic equipment. In 1957, the JETDS was formalized in MIL-STD-196.

Computer software and commercial unmodified electronics for which the manufacturer maintains design control are not covered.

== Applicability ==
Electronic material, from a military point of view, generally includes those electronic devices employed in data processing, detection and tracking (underwater, sea, land-based, air and space), recognition and identification, communications, aids to navigation, weapons control and evaluation, flight control, and electronics countermeasures. The JETDS applies to equipment throughout the DoD and select NATO allies today. Nomenclature is assigned to:

- Electronic material of military design
- Commercial electronic material that has been modified for military use and requires military identification and design control
- Electronic material which is intended for use by other Federal agencies or other governments that participate in the nomenclature system.

This system is separate from the "M" designation used in the Army Nomenclature System (MIL-STD-1464A).

== Organization ==
Items are given an Item Level which describes their hierarchy

Table I (MIL-STD-196G)
Item Level	Description	Examples
Unit	An item that may be capable of independent operation but whose functionality is not complete without other items. Installation and Maintenance kits are the only unit level items that may contain complement data.	Radio, computer, digital Power Supply, Antenna or radio receiver.
Group	A collection of units or assemblies that are not capable of performing a complete operational function. A group may be a subdivision of a set or may be designed to be added to or used in conjunction with a set to extend the function or the utility of the set.	Antenna group may be “used with” or “part of” a radio set.
Set	A unit or units and necessary assemblies, subassemblies and parts connected together or used in association to perform an operational function	Radio terminal set or sound measuring set, including parts, assemblies and units such as cables, microphone and measuring instruments.
Subsystem	A combination of sets, groups, etc., which performs an operational function within a system and is a major subdivision of the system.	Intercept-Aerial Guided Missile Subsystem
System	A combination of two or more sets, which may be physically separated when in operation, and such other assemblies, subassemblies and parts necessary to perform an operational function or functions.	Integrated Shipboard Computer System and a Navigational Control System
Center	A collection of units and items in one location, which provides facilities for the administrative control in an area of responsibility which is specifically assigned for development and maintenance of installations, control of personnel, or conduct of tactical operations	an Operations Center
Central	A grouping of sets, units or combinations thereof operated conjunctively in the same location for a common specific function. It may provide facilities for controlling switching, monitoring, etc., electronic and electrical equipment from one central location.	Operations Central, Central, Communications

== Basic Structure ==
The core of the JETDS system is the combination of a Type Designation with an Item Name to specify a particular item.

For example:

- With the AN/PEQ-2A Infrared Illuminator, the "AN/PEQ-2A" is the Type Designation while the Item Name Code (INC) 26086 "Illuminator, Infrared" is the Item Name.

=== Type Designation ===
The type designation is a unique series of letters and numbers which specifies an item. There are three basic forms of type designator used:

- Type designators for definitive Systems, Subsystems, Centers, Central, and Sets (e.g. AN/SPY-1)
- Type designators for definitive Groups (e.g. OK-198/G)
- Type designators for definitive Units (e.g. R-1641A/GSQ)

=== Item Name ===
The Type Designation is used in conjunction with an approved Item Name drawn from the H-6 Item Name Directory.

For example:

- Item Name Code (INC) 48198 from the H-6 Item Name Directory refers to "Terminal, Satellite Communications". This item name is used in the item officially designated as AN/FSC-78(V) Satellite Communications Terminal.

== Type Designation (Systems, Subsystems, Centers, Central, Sets) ==
The type designation used to specify Systems, Subsystems, Centers, Central, and Sets is made up of a prefix AN/, three type designation indicator letters, a hyphen, and a type designation number. The AN prefix signifies Army-Navy. The three type designation letters (chosen from the table below) specify where the equipment is used, what the equipment is, and what its purpose is. The type designation number helps specify the exact item; subsequent items with the same Installation/Type/Purpose are numbered sequentially (i.e. the next item developed after the AN/PRC-34 would be the AN/PRC-35).

For example:

- AN/PRC-77 is made up of
  - AN/ Army-Navy
  - PRC signifies Portable Radio used for two way Communications
  - -77 the type designation number

Table 1. Indicators for Systems/Subsystems/Centers/Central/Sets
Installation (1st letter)	Type of Equipment (2nd letter)	Purpose (3rd letter)	Miscellaneous
A - Piloted Aircraft (includes parachutes and piloted balloons)	A - Invisible Light, Heat Radiation (e.g., infrared)	A - Auxiliary Assembly	X, Y, Z for changes in voltage, frequency, or phase
B - Underwater Mobile (submarine)	B - Communications security (was Pigeon) (NSA use only)	B - Bombing	Tn for Training versions
C - Cryptographic Equipment (was Air, Transportable) (NSA use only)	C - Carrier (electronic wave or signal)	C - Communications (Receiving/Transmitting, two way)	(C) NSA use only
D - Pilotless Carrier (UAV, missile, rocket)	D - Radiac (Radioactivity Detection, Identification, and Computation)	D - Direction Finder, Reconnaissance, and Surveillance	(P) accepts plugins
	E - Laser (was NUPAC: Nuclear Protection & Control)	E - Ejection and/or Release	(V) variable items
F - Ground, Fixed *	F - Fiber Optics (was Photographic)		(- FT, - IN) identical items with varying lengths
G - Ground, General *	G - Telegraph or Teletype	G - Fire Control or Search Light Directing	( ) developmental or experimental
		H - Recording and/or Reproducing	
	I - Interphone and Public Address		
	J - Electromechanical or Inertial Wire Covered		
K - Amphibious (vehicles)	K - Telemetering	K - Computing	Automatic Digital Processing Equipment (ADPE)
	L - Countermeasures	L - removed (was Searchlight Control, now covered by "G")	1. Digital Equipment Only
M - Ground, Mobile *	M - Meteorological	M - Maintenance or Test Assemblies	2. Analog Equipment Only
	N - Sound in Air	N - Navigational Aids	3. Hybrid (1 & 2 combined)
			4. Input/Output Device
P - Portable (i.e. man-portable)	P - Radar	P - removed (was Reproducing, now covered by "H")	5. Magnetic Media
	Q - Sonar and Underwater Sound	Q - Special or Combination	6. Others
	R - Radio	R - Receiving or Passive Detecting	
S - Water (surface ship or buoys)	S - Special or Combination	S - Detecting or Range and Bearing, Search	
T - Ground, Transportable *	T - Telephone (Wire)	T - Transmitting	
U - General Utility (multi use) *			
V - Ground, Vehicle *	V - Visual, Visible Light		
W - Water Surface and Underwater combined *	W - Armament (not otherwise covered)	W - Automatic Flight or Remote Control	
	X - Facsimile or Television	X - Identification and Recognition	
	Y - Data Processing or Computer	Y - Surveillance (search, detect, and multiple target tracking) and Control (both fire control and/or air control)	
Z - Piloted and Pilotless Airborne Vehicles combined *	Z - Communications (NSA use only)	Z - Secure (NSA use only)	

* Additional info on Installation indicators:

- F is used for equipment installed in fixed ground (non-moveable) installations
- G is used for equipment which can be installed in two or more ground-based installation types
- M is used for equipment which is installed in a vehicle and is operated while the vehicle is in motion. M is only used when the vehicle's sole function is to house, transport, and operate the equipment. The vehicle must be "part of" the equipment
- T is used for ground-based equipment that is designed to be moved from place to place and the equipment is not covered by the installation indicators G, M, P, U, V. The equipment is not capable of being operated while in transit.
- U is used for equipment which can be installed in two or more types of installation indicators (e.g. a particular equipment that can be ground-based or airborne). U can also be used for equipment which has components in more than one installation class (e.g. a particular equipment that has one component that is airborne and another component that is ground-based).
- V is used for equipment which is installed in a vehicle whose main purpose is not to carry the electronic equipment. For example, the radio installed in a tank would use V as the tank's primary purpose is not just to carry the radio. The equipment must be usable while the vehicle is traveling.
- W is used for equipment that is installed in a vehicle which can be on the water's surface or operate below the surface.
- Z is used for equipment installed in a vehicle which can be piloted or pilotless

** Additional info on Type of Equipment indicators:

- P is used for the following types of equipment:
  - Radar equipment
  - Beacons which function with radar equipment
  - Electronic recognition and identification systems
  - Pulse-type navigational systems

== Type Designation (Group) ==
The type designation used to specify Groups (assemblies that are used in conjunction with others to function) is made up of a two letter group indicator (from the table below), followed by a dash, a group number, followed by a slash, and 1-3 letters specifying the equipment it is "part of" or "used with" (see Table 1). If the group is unique and only "part of" or "used with" one particular equipment, that equipment may be specified. If the group may be used with multiple different items, then it is more appropriate to designate it more generally.

For example:

- OE-162/ARC would refer to an antenna group used with aircraft-based radio communications equipment (i.e. AN/ARC-x equipment)
- If the control group OK-414 is only used with AN/TPN-30 (and not used with any other items), then it can be termed OK-414/TPN-30
- If the control group OK-414 can be used with various different ground-transportable radar navigational aids (i.e. AN/TPN-x equipment), then it should be termed OK-414/TPN
- If the console OJ-301 can be used with various different water-based radars (i.e. AN/SP -x equipment), it should be termed OJ-301/SP
- If the receiver group OR-221 can be used with various different general utility items (i.e. AN/U -x equipment), it should be termed OR-221/U

Table 2. Group Indicators
Group Indicator	Family Name	Examples (does not limit the application of group indicators)
OA	Miscellaneous groups	Groups otherwise not listed. Do not use if a more specific group indicator applies
OB	Multiplexer and/or demultiplexer groups	All types
OD	Indicator groups	All types
OE	Antenna groups	All types
OF	Adapter groups	All types
OG	Amplifier groups	All types
OH	Simulator groups	All types
OI	Cryptographic groups	All types
OJ	Consoles and Console groups	All types
OK	Control groups	All types
OL	Data analysis and Data processing groups	All types
OM	Modulator and/or Demodulator groups	All types
ON	Interconnecting groups	All types
OP	Power Supply groups	All non-rotating types
OQ	Test-Set groups	All types
OR	Receiver groups	All types
OS	Satellite groups	All types
OT	Transmitter groups	All types
OU	Converter groups	All types
OV	Generator groups	All types including power generating equipment
OW	Terminal groups	Telegraphs, radios, telephones, etc.
OX	Coder, Recorder, Interrogator, Transponder groups	All types
OY	Radar groups	Do not use if more specific indicator applies
OZ	Radio groups	Do not use if a more specific indicator (OE, OR, OT, etc.) applies

== Type Designation (Unit) ==
The type designation used to specify Units is made up of a unit letter(s) indicator (from the table below), followed by a dash, a unit number, followed by a slash, and 1-3 letters specifying the equipment it is part of or used with (see Table 1). As with Group type designations, if the Unit is unique and is "part of" or "used with" only one particular equipment, that equipment may be specified. If the unit is used with multiple different items, the equipment designation should include only the indicators which are common or appropriate. If a unit could be described by multiple indicators, the indicator which best describes the unit's primary function should be used. The exception would be if there exists a unit indicator which can describe the unit's multiple functions (see examples below); if such a multi-function describing unit indicator exists, then it should be used.

For example:

- R-40/VRC would refer to a receiver used in conjunction with ground vehicle-based radio communications (i.e. AN/VRC-x equipment)
- If the receiver R-40 is only used with the AN/VRC-12, then it should be termed R-40/VRC-12
- If the power supply PP-50 is used with various different ground vehicle-based radio communications (i.e. AN/VRC-x equipment), it should be termed PP-50/VRC
- If a power supply PP-60 is used with various different ground vehicle-based radio equipment (e.g. it's "part of" AN/VRC-12 and "used with" AN/VRR-40), it should be termed PP-60/VR
- If a power supply PP-70 is used with various ground vehicle-based equipment (e.g. it's "part of" or "used with" the AN/GRC-26 and the AN/GPS-20), it should be termed PP-70/G
- A unit can function as an amplifier as well as a power supply but its primary purpose is as an amplifier. As a result, it is designated AM-250/U
- A unit has both receiver and transmitter functions but the RT- unit indicator exists and covers units that can receive and transmit. As a result, the unit is designated RT-100/PRQ-21
- A unit has both motor and generator functions but the PU- unit indicator exists and covers units that can function as a motor a generator. As a result, the unit is designated PU-181/PGC-1

Table 3. Unit Indicators
Unit Indicator	Family Name	Examples (does not limit the application of unit indicators)
AB	Support for antennas	Antenna mounts, mast bases, mast sections, towers, etc.
AM	Amplifiers	Power, audio, interphone, radio frequency, video, electronic control, etc.
AS	Antennas, simple and complex	Arrays, parabolic type, masthead whip or telescopic loop, dipole, reflector, etc.
BA	Batteries, primary (non-rechargeable) type	Batteries, battery packs, etc.
BB	Batteries, secondary (rechargeable) type	Batteries, battery packs, etc.
BZ	Alarm units	All types
C	Controls	Control boxes, remote tuning controls, etc.
CA	Computer auxiliary units	Input/Output, peripherals, etc.
CC	Cable assemblies, RF	RF cables, waveguides, transmission lines, etc., with terminals
CD	Controlling devices	Complex controlling devices
CM	Comparators	Compares two or more input signals
CN	Compensators	Electrical and/or mechanical compensating, regulating, or attenuating apparatus
CP	Computers	Mechanical and/or electronic mathematical calculating devices
CU	Couplers	Impedance coupling devices, directional couplers, etc.
CV	Converters (electronic)	Electronic apparatus for changing the phase frequency, or from “one” medium to “another”
CW	Radomes	Radomes
CX	Cable assemblies, non-RF	Non-RF cables with terminals, test leads, also composite cables of RF and non-RF conductors
CY	Cases and cabinets	Rigid and semi-rigid structures for enclosing or carrying equipment
D	Dispensers	Chaff
DA	Loads, dummy	RF and non-RF test loads
DI	Data transmission units	Devices for authentication and transferring recorded or generated data over transmitter/receiver links
DT	Detecting heads	Magnetic, capacitive, or optical pickup devices, search coils, hydrophones, etc.
DU	Display Units/Monitors	All types that are external devices for computers, test sets, etc.
F	Filter units	Electronic types, back-pass, low pass, band suppression, noise telephone, filter networks; excludes non-repairable types
FO	Fiber optics	Electrical, electronic, and communications, etc.
FR	Frequency measuring devices	Frequency meters, tuned cavity, etc.
G	Generators, power	Electrical power generators without prime movers (see PU)
GO	Goniometers	Instruments for measuring angles for determination of energy transferred from moving to fixed coil (directional) antennas, etc.
H	Head, hand, and chest sets	Includes earphones
HD	Environmental apparatus	Heating, cooling, dehumidifying, pressure, vacuum devices, etc.
ID	Indiciator units, non-cathode ray tube	Calibrated dials and meters, indicating lights, etc. (see also IP)
IM	Intensity measuring devices	Includes SWR gear, field intensity noise meters, slotted lines, etc.
IP	Indicator units, cathode ray tube	Azimuth, elevation, panoramic, etc.
J	Interface units	Interconnecting and junction units, etc. Do not use if a more specific indicator applies.
KG	Key generators	Units generating a pseudorandom sequence of crypto variables using algorithms
KY	Keying devices	Mechanical, electrical, and electronic key coders, interrupters, etc.
LA	Lasers	Communication, electrical, etc.
LS	Loudspeakers	Separately housed loudspeakers and intercommunication stations
M	Microphones	Radio, telephone, throat, hand, etc.
MD	Modulators, demodulators, discriminators	Devices for varying amplitude, frequency, or phase
ME	Meters	Multimeters, vacuum tube voltmeters, power meters, volt-ohm-milliameters, etc.
MK	Miscellaneous kits	Maintenance, modification, etc.
ML	Meteorological devices	Miscellaneous meteorological equipment, etc.
MO	Multipurpose	Units that perform two or more functions
MT	Mountings	Mountings, racks, frames, stands, etc.
MU	Memory units	Memory units
MW	Microwave	Communications, etc.
MX	Miscellaneous	Equipment not otherwise classified. Do not use if a better indicator is available
O	Oscillators	Master frequency, blocking, multi-vibrators, etc. (for test oscillators: see SG)
OC	Oceanographic devices	Bathythermograph, etc.
OS	Oscilloscope, test	Test oscilloscopes, for general test purposes (see IP)
PL	Plug-in units	Plug-in units not otherwise classified
PP	Power supplies	Non-rotating machine types such as vibrator pack, rectifier, thermoelectric, etc.
PT	Mapping and plotting units	Electronic types only
PU	Power equipment	Rotating power equipment, motor-generators, dynamotors, etc.
R	Receivers	Receivers, all types except telephone
RB	Robotics	Electric-mechanical, etc.
RD	Recorder-Reproducers	Sound, graphic, tape, wire, film, disc, facsimile, magnetic, mechanical, etc.
RE	Relay assembly units	Electrical, electronic, etc.
RL	Reeling machines	Mechanisms for dispensing and rewinding antenna or field wire cable, etc.
RO	Recorders	Sound, graphic, tape, wire, film, disc, facsimile, magnetic, mechanical, tape and card punch, etc.
RP	Reproducers	Sound, graphic, tape, wire, film, disc, facsimile, magnetic, mechanical, punched tape and card readers, etc.
RR	Reflectors	Target, confusion, etc., except antenna reflectors (see AS)
RT	Receiver and Transmitter	Radio and radar transceivers, composites of transmitter and receiver, etc.
S	Shelter	Protective shelters, etc.
SA	Switching units	Manual, impact, motor-driven, pressure-operated, electronic, etc.
SB	Switchboards	Telephone, fire control, power distribution, etc.
SG	Generator, signal	Test oscillators, noise generators, etc. (see O)
SM	Simulators	Flight, aircraft, target, signal, etc.
SN	Synchronizers	Equipment to coordinate two or more functions
SS	Special purpose	Devices performing unique functions
SU	Optical units	Electro-optical units, such as night vision, scopes, sights, auto-collimator, viewers, trackers, alignment equipment
SY	Speech, secure	Devices that secure voice transmission/receiving equipment
T	Transmitters	Transmitters, all types except telephone
TA	Telephone apparatus	Miscellaneous telephone equipment
TB	Towed body	Hydrodynamic enclosures used to house transducers, hydrophones, and other electronic equipment
TD	Timing devices	Mechanical and electronic timing devices, range devices, multiplexers, electronic gates, etc.
TF	Transformers	When used as separate units
TG	Positioning devices	Tilt and/or train assemblies
TH	Telegraph apparatus	Miscellaneous telegraph items
TN	Tuning units	Receiver, transmitter, antenna, tuning units, etc.
TR	Transducers	Sonar transducers, vibration pickups, etc. (see H, LS, and M)
TS	Test units	Test and measuring equipment not otherwise classified. Do not use if more specific indicators apply
TT	Teletypewriter and facsimile apparatus	Teletype, tape, facsimile miscellaneous equipment
TU	Television	Special types
TW	Tape units	Preprogrammed with operational test and checkout data
V	Vehicles	Carts, dollies, vans peculiar to electronic equipment
ZM	Impedance measuring devices	Used for measuring Q, C, L, R, or PF, etc.

== Additional Specifiers ==
=== Modification Letter ===
A modification letter is placed after the type designation number to signify a modification to a specific equipment that still retains at least one-way interchangeability with all previous versions. Modification letters begin with "A" and proceed sequentially. For more information on Interchangeability (see below).

Note: the letters "I", "O", "Q", "S", "T", "X", "Y", and "Z" are not to be used as modification letters

For example:

- AN/PAS-13A and AN/PAS-13B are modifications of AN/PAS-13. A new AN/PAS-13A can be used in place of an AN/PAS-13 thermal sight; an AN/PAS-13B can be used in place of an AN/PAS-13 or an AN/PAS-13A.
- RT-206A is a modification of RT-206. A RT-206A can be used in place of an RT-206.

=== Specific Configurations of Variables ===
A suffix "(V)" following the type designation number and any modification letters indicates variable components or configurations for said Group/Set/Subsystem/System/Center/Central. A number may follow the parenthetical V to identify a specific configuration.

For example:

- AN/PRC-1(V) would be a complete radio communication set (AN/PRC-1) capable of operating in multiple different configurations with variable components.
- AN/PRC-1A(V)4 would be the 4th specific configuration of the AN/PRC-1A(V) radio communication set.
- OT-1957(V)2/PRC-1(V) would be the 2nd specific configuration of the OT-1957(V) transmitter group required as a component for the AN/PRC-1(V) radio communication set (which can be configured in various ways).

Note: A specific equipment should only be given a (V) signifier if it can be configured with different components, not simply because one of its components has a (V) signifier. The (V) signifier would be warranted if the item accepted variable configurations of a particular component.

For example:

- AN/ARC-190(V) would NOT be appropriate solely because it used the CU-2314(V)1/ARC-190 HF Antenna Coupler if it could only accept CU-2314-(V)1 and no other antenna coupler
- Since, in reality, AN/ARC-190(V) can actually accept CU-2314(V)1/ARC-190 as well as CU-2275(V)1/ARC-190, the (V) signifier is appropriate. It would also be appropriate even if it only accepted CU-2275(V)1/ARC-190 and CU-2275(V)2/ARC-190.

=== Plug-In (capable) ===
A suffix of "(P)" following the type designation number and any modification letters indicates a Unit which is designed to accept "plug-in" modules capable of changing the function, frequency, or other technical characteristics of the unit. The plug-in is not considered part of the unit itself.

For example:

- R-00(P)/PRC-1 would be a radio receiver unit (capable of accepting plug-in modules) that is required as a component for the AN/PRC-1 radio set.

=== Cryptographic/Classified ===
A suffix of "(C)" following the type designation number and any modification letters indicates an item which directly contains NSA-controlled cryptographic material.

For example:

- AN/PRC-163B(V)2(P)(C) would be a portable radio receiver/transmitter AN/PRC-163, modification B, configuration 2, that accepts plug-ins and contains NSA-controlled cryptographic material.

=== Training (Set, Subsystem, System, Center, or Central) ===
A suffix of "-Tn ", where n is a number, indicates equipment (Set, Subsystem, System, Center, or Central) designed to provide training in the operation of a specific set or multiple sets. If it is designed specifically to provide training for one particular unit, then that unit may be specified. If it is a training equipment which can provide practice for various different sets/subsystems/systems etc., then that should be indicated with the appropriate letter indicators.

For example:

- AN/PRC-1-T1 would be the first training set for the AN/PRC-1 radio set.
- AN/PRC-T3 would be the third training set for several different AN/PRC-n radio sets.
- AN/URC-T1 would be used for the first training set for AN/PRC-n and AN/VRC-n radio sets; this designation indicates a training set which can be used for complete radio sets of similar type and purpose but different installation locations (i.e. some are man-portable, some are vehicle-mounted).

=== Training (Group or Unit) ===
- A "T" is added after the type designation numbers for a Group or Unit if it is designed to provide training but is not considered "part of" other equipment. If it is "part of" other equipment, the T specifier is not used.

For example:

- RT-10T/PRC would indicate a training receiver/transmitter Unit that is used with radio sets.

=== Automated Data Processing Equipment (ADPE) ===
A digit or digits in parentheses following the type designation letters indicates the type of ADPE included in the item.

For example:

- AN/UYK (1, 4, 5) contains a digital processor (1), Input/Output device (4), and tape equipment (5)

ADPE
1	Digital Equipment Only
2	Analog Equipment Only
3	Hybrid (1 & 2 combined)
4	Input/Output Device
5	Magnetic Media
6	Others

=== Maintenance Equipment ===
Maintenance equipment that is given a type designation is set up as AN/xxM, where the first two letters after the slash (signifying Installation and Type of equipment) are followed by an M.

However, if a maintenance or test Unit or Group is considered a "part of" the item in question, it does not receive the M signifier.

For example:

- AN/MPM-8 is used to maintain Radar Sets AN/MPG-5, AN/MPS-5, AN/MPS-12, and AN/MPN-9
- AN/URM-20 can be used to maintain Radio Set AN/TRC-7 or AN/ARC-2

=== Modified Power Requirements ===
A change in the power input voltage, phase, or frequency is denoted by addition of the letter(s) "X", "Y", or "Z". The first such modification would be denoted with an "X", the second with a "Y", the third with a "Z", the fourth with an "XX", etc. If simultaneous modifications are made that improve the equipment as well as affect power input, then both a modification letter (A, B, C, D, etc.) as well as a power requirement modification letter (X, Y, Z, etc.) will be used.

For example:

- AN/TRC-100X is used for a model of AN/TRC-100 which is modified to run on 24v DC instead of the usual 110v AC
- AN/TRC-100AX is used for a model of AN/TRC-100A which has modified power input requirements. Alternatively, it may be used if the model AN/TRC-100 underwent simultaneous modifications that improved the model and affected the power input.
- AN/TRC-100B(V)2Y would be the second such power modification to the AN/TRC-100B in its 2nd configuration form

=== Developmental/Experimental ===
A pair of parentheses surrounding where the type designation number would be located is used to signify an experimental or developmental model. Type designation number is not required but is useful for clarity. When the developmental model is ready for production, the parentheses are struck off.

For example:

- AN/ARC-( ) would designate an experimental radio set
- AN/AAR-(87) would designate an experimental airborne invisible light or heat radiation detection system. When ready for production, it would become the AN/AAR-87

=== Servo Amplifiers ===
Electronic type (non-rotating) servo amplifiers are designated "AM"; rotating type servo amplifiers are designated "PU".

=== Plug-in Units ===
Plug-in Units which can be described by their function (like receiver, microphone, loudspeaker, etc.) will use those corresponding Unit indicators. If no indicator exists to describe the plug-in's function, then the generic plug-in unit indicator (PL) will be used.

For example:

- A microphone plug-in would be designated as MW-2/PRC
- A plug-in whose function can't be described by an existing unit indicator would be designated as PL-1/ARC

=== Varying Lengths ===
Type designators for groups and units like cables, waveguides, cords, etc. may also include a parenthetical "( -FT, -IN)" to designate the specified length. These type designators will not include a specified System/Subsystem/Center/Central/Set type designator after the / but will be given a more generic indicator like /U or /GR. However, a group or unit type designation that is already linked to a specific system/subsystem/center/central/set may use ( -FT, -IN) if the system/subsystem/center/central/set uses multiple of the group/unit and they are only distinguishable by length. This use is only for new assignments and will not be retroactive

For example:

- A cable assembly which can be used with the AN/GRC-26 would not be designated CC-5/GRC-26 but would be designated CC-5/U or CC-5/GR.
- CX-13293/VRC is already linked to VRC, however, it may use the ( -FT, -IN) specifier because VRC configurations may use multiple CX-13293 group/units which are only distinguishable by length (e.g. CX-13293/VRC (6 FT, 0 IN) and CX-13293/VRC (8 FT, 0 IN)

=== Batteries ===
Primary batteries (non-rechargeable) are designated using "BA"; Secondary type batteries (rechargeable) are designated using "BB".

== Miscellaneous ==
=== Interchangeability ===
- One-way Interchangeability: the later modified version of an item can be used in place of earlier versions but not the other way around. Essentially it is backwards compatibility.
- Electrical Interchangeability: the later modified item can be used in place of any earlier models without requiring any work to the electrical systems (i.e. rewiring, use of adapters, etc.).
- Mechanical Interchangeability: the modified item can be installed and used without any major physical modifications. Switches, connectors, etc. will be in the same general location as before. Once installed, the modified item will not substantially affect its "parent" item's center of gravity.
- Functional Interchangeability: the modified item can perform the same task as earlier models without requiring any assistance.
- Maintenance parts Interchangeability: the modified maintenance part can be installed into an item without requiring any additional tools or modifications and without affecting the item's performance or ratings.

=== "Part of" vs "Used with" ===
- An item is "part of" a specific equipment if it is required for that equipment to function. Items that are "part of" a particular equipment will be listed in the equipment's complement data and will always be issued with that equipment
- An item is "used with" a specific equipment if it functions with or alongside that equipment but is not issued with it. This can include items of the same item level or higher item level. An item which augments or extends the function of an equipment and is only issued under special circumstances is considered as "used with" but not "part of" said equipment.

== History ==
JETDS was adopted 16 February 1943 by the Joint Communications Board for all new Army and Navy airborne, radio, and radar equipment. Over time it was extended to cover the Marine Corps and the Navy's ship, submarine, amphibious, and ground electronic equipment. When the Air Force was established as a separate department, it continued the use of the system for electronic equipment. JETDS was adopted by the United States Coast Guard in 1950, Canada in 1951 and the NSA in 1959 (though the NSA continued to use its own TSEC telecommunications security nomenclature). In 1957 the U.S. Department of Defense approved a military standard for the nomenclature, MIL-STD-196. The system has been modified over time, with some types (e.g. carrier pigeon -B-) dropped and others (e.g. computers and cryptographic equipment) added. The latest version, MIL-STD-196G, was issued in 2018.

MIL-STD-196 Rev. History
Revision	Date
Original	9 May 1957
A	16 September 1960
B	7 April 1965
C	22 April 1971
D	19 January 1985
E	17 February 1998
F	11 September 2013
G	30 May 2018

== Derived systems ==
- The Japan Self-Defense Forces use a similar system that replaces the "AN/" prefix with "J/". Equipment sharing the same designation may or may not be equivalent. For example, the J/AWG-12 fitted on the Mitsubishi F-1 is said to be closely related to the AN/AWG-12, but the 1990s J/APG-1 is clearly different from the 1940s AN/APG-1 on the P-61B.
- The Military of the Republic of China (Taiwan) uses a similar system with the "CS/" prefix. For example, CS/MPG-25 is a radar related to the AN/MPQ-46.

== See also ==
- List of military electronics of the United States
- Signal Corps Radio early system
- List of U.S. Signal Corps vehicles V-numbers
- AWS color code for resistors and capacitors following AWS/JAN specifications
- Army Nomenclature System naming system for items not classified as electronics
- United States Department of Defense aerospace vehicle designation naming system also called MDS (Mission Design Series)

== Notes ==
- The US government's BINCS database currently assigns CAGE code 80058 to JETDS items.
- The US government's system for input of Form DD-61 Request for Nomenclature is the Joint Electronic Type Designation Automated System (JETDAS).
