= Cryptography standards =

Number of standards related to cryptography

There are a number of standards related to cryptography. Standard algorithms and protocols provide a focus for study; standards for popular applications attract a large amount of cryptanalysis.

== Encryption standards ==
- Data Encryption Standard (DES, now obsolete)
- Advanced Encryption Standard (AES)
- RSA the original public key algorithm
- OpenPGP

== Hash standards ==
- MD5 128-bit (obsolete)
- SHA-1 160-bit (obsolete)
- SHA-2 available in 224, 256, 384, and 512-bit variants
- HMAC keyed hash
- PBKDF2 Key derivation function (RFC 2898)

== Digital signature standards ==
- Digital Signature Standard (DSS), based on the Digital Signature Algorithm (DSA)
- RSA
- Elliptic Curve DSA

== Public-key infrastructure (PKI) standards ==
- X.509 Public Key Certificates

== Wireless Standards ==
- Wired Equivalent Privacy (WEP), severely flawed and superseded by WPA
- Wi-Fi Protected Access (WPA) better than WEP, a 'pre-standard' partial version of 802.11i
- 802.11i a.k.a. WPA2, uses AES and other improvements on WEP
- A5/1 and A5/2 cell phone encryption for GSM

== U.S. Government Federal Information Processing Standards (FIPS) ==
- FIPS PUB 31 Guidelines for Automatic Data Processing Physical Security and Risk Management 1974
- FIPS PUB 46-3 Data Encryption Standard (DES) 1999
- FIPS PUB 73 Guidelines for Security of Computer Applications 1980
- FIPS PUB 74 Guidelines for Implementing and Using the NBS Data Encryption Standard 1981
- FIPS PUB 81 DES Modes of Operation 1980
- FIPS PUB 102 Guideline for Computer Security Certification and Accreditation 1983
- FIPS PUB 112 Password Usage 1985, defines 10 factors to be considered in access control systems that are based on passwords
- FIPS PUB 113 Computer Data Authentication 1985, specifies a Data Authentication Algorithm (DAA) based on DES, adopted by the Department of Treasury and the banking community to protect electronic fund transfers.
- FIPS PUB 140-2 Security Requirements for Cryptographic Modules 2001, defines four increasing security levels
- FIPS PUB 171 Key Management Using ANSI X9.17 (ANSI X9.17-1985) 1992, based on DES
- FIPS PUB 180-2 Secure Hash Standard (SHS) 2002 defines the SHA family
- FIPS PUB 181 Automated Password Generator (APG) 1993
- FIPS PUB 185 Escrowed Encryption Standard (EES) 1994, a key escrow system that provides for decryption of telecommunications when lawfully authorized.
- FIPS PUB 186-2 Digital Signature Standard (DSS) 2000
- FIPS PUB 190 Guideline for the Use of Advanced Authentication Technology Alternatives 1994
- FIPS PUB 191 Guideline for the Analysis of local area network Security 1994
- FIPS PUB 196 Entity Authentication Using Public Key Cryptography 1997
- FIPS PUB 197 Advanced Encryption Standard (AES) 2001
- FIPS PUB 198 The Keyed-Hash Message Authentication Code (HMAC) 2002

== Internet Requests for Comments (RFCs) ==
Below is a non-exhaustive overview of notable cryptography-related RFCs, grouped by topic.

Transport Security

- RFC 8446 The Transport Layer Security (TLS) Protocol Version 1.3 Defines secure web communication (HTTPS), introduces modern cipher suites and removes legacy cryptography.
- RFC 5246 The Transport Layer Security Protocol Version 1.2 Predecessor to TLS 1.3, still widely implemented.

Public-Key Cryptography and Signatures

- RFC 8017 RSA Cryptography Specifications Defines RSA encryption and signature schemes such as RSA-OAEP and RSASSA-PSS.
- RFC 6979 Specifies deterministic generation of the nonce in DSA/ECDSA to avoid catastrophic randomness failures.
- RFC 7748 Defines modern elliptic curves X25519 and X448 for Diffie–Hellman key exchange.

Symmetric Cryptography and MACs

- RFC 2104 Defines the HMAC construction, widely used with hash functions such as SHA-256.
- RFC 5869 A widely used key derivation function used in protocols like TLS 1.3.
- RFC 8439 Defines the ChaCha20 stream cipher and Poly1305 MAC AEAD construction used in TLS, SSH, and QUIC.

Public-Key Infrastructure and Certificates

- RFC 5280 Defines the Internet profile for X.509 certificates, used by TLS certificate authorities.
- RFC 6960 Defines a protocol for checking certificate revocation status.

Secure Messaging and Data Formats

- RFC 5652 Defines the message format used for secure email (S/MIME).
- RFC 4880 Specifies the OpenPGP encryption and signature format used in tools like GnuPG.

Network Security (IPsec)

- RFC 4301 Defines the overall IPsec security architecture.
- RFC 4303 Specifies encrypted IP packets for IPsec.
- RFC 7296 Defines key exchange and authentication for IPsec VPNs.

== Classified Standards ==
- EKMS NSA's Electronic Key Management System
- FNBDT NSA's secure narrow band voice standard
- Fortezza encryption based on portable crypto token in PC Card format
- STE secure telephone
- STU-III older secure telephone
- TEMPEST prevents compromising emanations

== Other ==
- IPsec Virtual Private Network (VPN) and more
- IEEE P1363 covers most aspects of public-key cryptography
- Transport Layer Security (formerly SSL)
- SSH secure Telnet and more
- Content Scramble System (CSS, the DVD encryption standard, broken by DeCSS)
- Kerberos authentication standard
- RADIUS authentication standard
- ANSI X9.59 electronic payment standard
- Common Criteria Trusted operating system standard
- CRYPTREC Japanese Government's cryptography recommendations

== See also ==
- NSA cryptography
- Topics in cryptography
