= KSV-21 =

US NSA-approved PC card

The KSV-21 Enhanced Crypto Card is a US National Security Agency-approved PC card that provides Type 1 encryption functions and key storage to the STE secure telephones and other devices.

The KSV-21 was originally built by SafeNet but has since been purchased by Raytheon as a tamper-resistant reprogrammable module and is backwards compatible with the KOV-14 Fortezza Plus card. It adds features including support for SCIP, Enhanced Firefly and NSA's 21st century Key Management Initiative. It can perform Type 1 encryption and hash operations at 80 Mbit/s. As of 2008, the KOV-14 is beginning to be phased out and replaced by the KSV-21.

The US version is certified to protect classified data through the Top Secret/SCI level as well as unclassified sensitive information. Versions are available for use with other nations, including:

- Canadian national (KSV-22)
- Combined Communications Electronics Board (CCEB) (KSV-30)
- NATO (KSV-40)
- Coalition Partners (SSV-50)

Prices range from $900 for single units to under $400/each in multi-thousand lot quantities as of 2008.
