= SAVILLE =

Classified National Security Agency Type 1 encryption algorithm

SAVILLE is a classified NSA Type 1 encryption algorithm, developed in the late 1960s, jointly by the Government Communications Headquarters (GCHQ) in the UK and the National Security Agency (NSA) in the US. It is used broadly, often for voice encryption, and implemented in many encryption devices.

Little is known publicly about the algorithm itself due to its classified nature and inclusion in the NSA's Suite A. Some documentation related to the KYK-13 fill device and statements made by military officials confirm that SAVILLE has a 128-bit key, which consists of 120 key bits and an 8-bit checksum. Furthermore, it is known that SAVILLE has two modes of operation: Autonomous Mode (also known as Key-Auto-KEY or KAK) and Autoclave Mode (also known as Cipher-Text Auto Key or CTAK). On the AIM microchip, it runs at 4% of the clock rate (compare DES at 76% and BATON at 129%). The Cypris chip mentions two modes; specifications for Windster and Indictor specify that they provide Saville I.

Some devices and protocols that implement SAVILLE:

- Secure Telephone Equipment (STU)
- The VINSON family (voice encryption)
- UK Lamberton (BID/250)
- APCO Project 25 (single-channel land mobile radios) (Saville has algorithm ID 04)
- Versatile encryption chips: AIM, Cypris, Sierra I/II, Windster, Indictor, Presidio, Railman
- Spendex 40
- Spendex 50 (also known as DBT)
- Elcrovox 1/4
- Motorola's SECURENET encryption module named FASCINATOR
