= TALC+ =

The Tanker Airborne Long-range Communication Plus (TALC+) Kit is a USAF satellite communication system for low-data-rate, classified communications. TALC+ includes an Iridium radio-modem, an antenna installed in the sextant port, a strong encryption device, a classified laptop computer, a handset, and a headset within a carry-on sized case.

TALC+ provides KC-135 aircraft affordable, secure, global, and simple communication. TALC+ can call almost any telephone worldwide for non-secure voice communication, talk up to Secret with STEs (or other SCIP-based telephones), or join chatrooms on SIPRNet.

TALC+ may be customized, renamed, and certified for other platforms such as KC-10s, C-130s, and other Iridium-compatible aircraft, trucks or buildings.

TALC+ was created by the Air Force Research Laboratory's Center for Rapid Innovation and NAL Research Corporation in response to requests from AMC and AFGSC leadership needs. TALC+ has been purchased by the Air Mobility Command and on the MC-130J

To watch a four-chapter video explaining how to use and install TALC+, just CAC-into milTube and search for TALC+.
