= AN/PRC-148 =

Military handheld software-defined radio

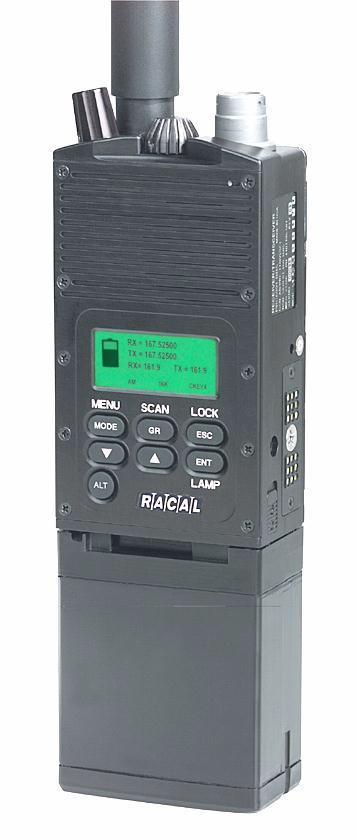
MBITR Radio

The AN/PRC-148 Multiband Inter/Intra Team Radio (MBITR) is a widely fielded handheld multiband, tactical software-defined radio, used by NATO forces around the world. The radio is built by Thales Communications, a subsidiary of the France-based Thales Group.

The MBITR was developed by the United States Special Operations Command (USSOCOM) and Thales Communications in the 1990s and went into production in 1994, addressing the need for a secure multiband handheld radio. It has been more widely deployed with Stryker Combat Teams and with troops deploying to Iraq and Afghanistan. As of August 2007, 100,000 MBITRs have been fielded, over 31,000 of which are in use by the US Army.

In accordance with the Joint Electronics Type Designation System (JETDS), the "AN/PRC-148" designation represents the 148th design of an Army-Navy electronic device for portable two-way communications radio. The JETDS system also now is used to name all Department of Defense electronic systems.

== Variants ==
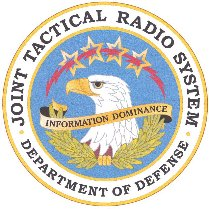

AN/PRC-148 JEM Joint Tactical Radio System Enhanced MBITR (JEM) is an upgraded MBITR. The standard AN/PRC-148 MBITR can be seamlessly upgraded to the AN/PRC-148(V)3/(V)4 JEM, which is the first radio to be JTRS Software Communications Architecture 2.2 compliant. The radio is upgraded by replacing the front panel and Communications Security (COMSEC) control hardware assemblies. The JEM is in production and has been fielded with USSOCOM.

While the JEM has passed government certification, it is an evolutionary platform, and not fully compatible with all specifications of JTRS. The fully compatible system is the JTRS HMS, (Handheld, Manpack and Small form-fit) being developed by General Dynamics, Thales Communications, BAE Systems, and Rockwell Collins are all prime subcontractors. The HMS is expected to be an integral part in the US Army's Future Combat Systems program. The MBITR's primary competition comes from Harris Corporation's AN/PRC-152 software-defined radio, which has also received SCA and NSA certification.

AN/PRC-6809 MBITR Clear is a variant of the MBITR without encryption. While the PRC-148 includes NSA Type 1 encryption in all versions, the PRC-6809 uses Triple Data Encryption Standard, making it available to police, firefighters, and militaries unable to obtain International Traffic in Arms Regulations (ITAR) approval.

== Features ==
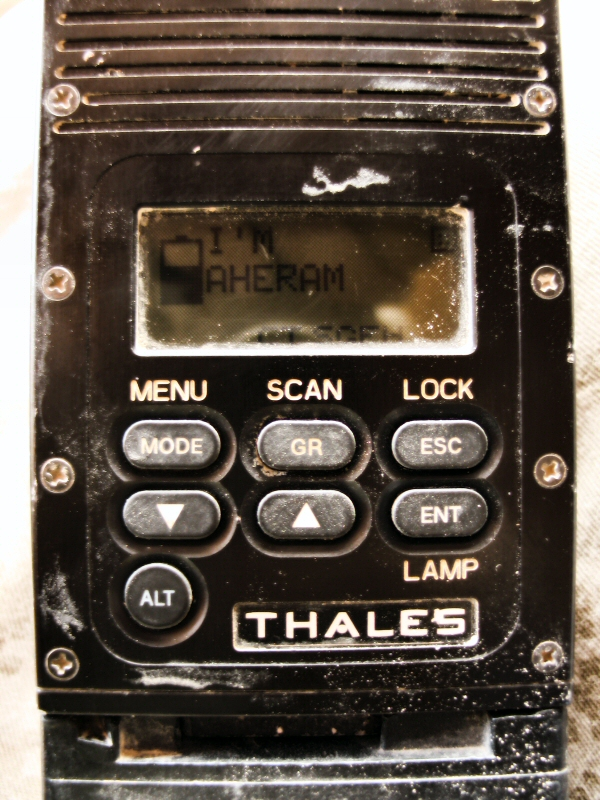
Screen of MBITR

Source: Thales

- Upgradable to Joint Tactical Radio System Enhanced MBITR (JEM); AN/PRC-148(V)1(C) or AN/PRC-148(V)2(C)
- AM/FM
- Voice/Data
- HAVEQUICK I/II, SINCGARS ESIP single channel and frequency hopping, ANDVT
- Analog narrowband capable (12.5 kHz)
- 2 and 20 meter immersible variants
- CTCSS tones
- Retransmission between handheld radios (with special purpose filters and cable)
- JITC tested

== Interoperability ==
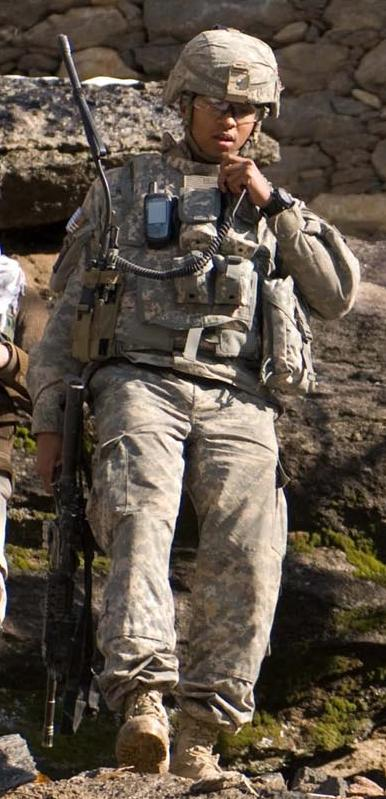
Soldier talks on MBITR radio

The MBITR can interoperate with the following devices:

- AN/PRC-68
- AN/PRC-77
- AN/PRC-113
- AN/PRC-117
- AN/PRC-119
- AN/PRC-139
- AN/PSC-5C/D
- AN/VRC-12 family
- Motorola LST-5B/C
- Motorola MX300 Series
- Motorola Saber
- Motorola XTS 3000
- Motorola XTS 5000

== Technical characteristics ==
Source: Thales

- Frequency Range:
  - Contiguous: 30–512 MHz (9.99–0.59 m)
  - Step size: 5 and 6.25 kHz
- Modulation: AM/FM (Single channel), HAVEQUICK I/II, SINCGARS ESIP single channel and frequency hopping, ANDVT (PSK)
- Power Output: User selectable
  - AM: 0.1 to 5.0 Watts
  - FM: 0.1, 0.5, 1.0, 3.0 and 5.0 Watts
- Weight: 30.6 ounces (870 g)
- Encryption: NSA Endorsed Type 1, Type III DES

== Accessories ==
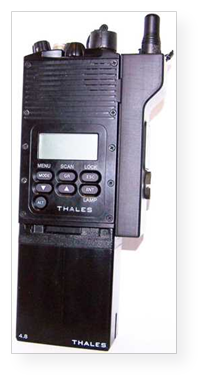
Melanie-MBITR

Accessories for the MBITR include the Remote Control Unit (RCU) with GPS, MELANIE H_N, and a Vehicle Adapter.

MELANIE hand-held allows Blue Force Tracking (BFT) by collecting GPS data from user nodes (also in ANDVT radio mode), and provides a ruggedized interface connecting MBITR to personal computers (or Android tablets). MELANIE fits to an external connector of MBITR and forwards data/audio connection for C^{4}OPS and for RCU. Typical BFT configuration of a MELANIE network consists of at least a Headquarters station plus user nodes. MELANIE Handheld is able to send its own position over the VHF or satellite network while exchanging data (Chat, File transfer, Video, TR@CER, etc.). In transparent mode it has a throughput of 13.5 kbit/s with FEC. The device is built by Thales Italia Chieti Site, a subsidiary of the Thales Group.

== See also ==
- AN/PRC-152
- Tactical Vest Antenna System
- List of military electronics of the United States
