= Yankee (disambiguation) =

Yankee is a term for various groups of Americans.

Yankee may also refer to:

== Sports ==
=== Teams ===
- New York Yankees, an American Major League Baseball team
  - Auburn Yankees, two minor league baseball teams based in Auburn, New York, one in 1889, and another affiliated with the New York Yankees from 1958 to 1961
  - Battle Creek Yankees, an affiliate in 2004 and 2005
  - Boise Yankees, an affiliate in 1952 and 1953
  - Dominican Summer League Yankees 1
  - Dominican Summer League Yankees 2
  - Fort Lauderdale Yankees, a Class A Florida State League affiliate (1962–1992)
  - Gulf Coast Yankees, a Rookie League affiliate
  - Kearney Yankees, an affiliate from 1956 to 1959
  - Manchester Yankees, two affiliates: in the Class B New England League (1948–1949) and in the Double-A Eastern League (1969–1971)
  - Paintsville Yankees, a former minor league affiliate
  - Scranton/Wilkes-Barre Highlanders (formerly the Scranton/Wilkes-Barre Yankees), a Triple-A Minor League affiliate
  - Staten Island Yankees, a Low-A Minor League affiliate
  - Tampa Yankees, a High-A Minor League affiliate
  - Trenton Thunder, a Double-A Minor League affiliate
  - Ventura Yankees, an affiliate from 1947 to 1949
  - West Haven Yankees, a Double-A Eastern League baseball team affiliated with the New York Yankees (1972–1979) and the Oakland A's (1980–1982)
- New York Yankees (disambiguation), various defunct American teams
- United States Men's National Soccer Team, sometimes referred to as the "Yankees"
- Augusta Yankees, a South Atlantic League minor league baseball team based in Augusta, Georgia, from 1962 to 1963
- Bronx Yankees, an American Basketball League team in the 1938-39 season

=== Conferences ===
- Yankee Conference (1946–1997), a former collegiate sports conference in the eastern United States
- Yankee Small College Conference, a northern New England Division II athletic conference

=== Other ===
- Yankee Handicap, an American Thoroughbred horse race from 1935 to 1987

== In the military ==
- Yankee-class submarine, NATO reporting name for several types of Soviet nuclear submarines
- USS Yankee (1861), a sidewheel steamer
- USS Yankee (1892), a steam ship used in the Spanish–American War
- The 'Y' version of the Aeritalia G.91 fighter aircraft

== Transportation ==
- American Aviation AA-1 Yankee, a light aircraft
- Yankee (ferry), an historic ferry homeported in New York
- Brigantine Yankee, a steel-hulled schooner which went aground in 1964
- Yankee (motorcycle), an American-made motorcycle
- Yankee (yacht), J-class yacht involved in the America's Cup

== Businesses ==
- Yankee Candle, an American manufacturer of scented candles
- Yankee Group, an American information technology and market research advisory firm
- Yankee (department store), a defunct department store in Michigan, United States

== Arts and entertainment ==
- Yankee (film), a 1966 Italian film
- Yankee (album) (2014), by Japanese musician Kenshi Yonezu
- Yankee (TV series), a 2019 Mexican TV series
- Yankees (album) (1983), improvised music by Derek Bailey, John Zorn and George Lewis
- Yankee (magazine), a New Hampshire periodical
- The Yankee, an American literary magazine published 1828–1829

== Other uses ==
- The letter Y in the NATO phonetic alphabet
- Daddy Yankee (born 1977), Puerto Rican singer
- Yankee Sullivan (1811–1856), bare-knuckle fighter and boxer
- A type of bet offered by UK bookmakers
- Yankee Harbour, Greenwich Island, Antarctica
- Yankee Lake (New York), a lake in Sullivan County, New York
- Yankī (ヤンキー), a Japanese term for a juvenile delinquent

== See also ==
- Billy Yank, a reference to a Union supporter during the American Civil War
- Swamp Yankee, a rural New Englander
- Damn Yankees (disambiguation)
- All pages beginning with Yankee
- Yanki (disambiguation)
- Yanqi (disambiguation)
