= CONDOR secure cell phone =

NSA secure phone development project

Project "Condor" was an NSA project for the development of secure mobile phones.

== See also ==
- Secure Communications Interoperability Protocol
- Sectéra Secure Module for Motorola GSM cell phones
