= Yankey =

Yankey is a surname. Notable people with the surname include:

- Diana Yankey (born 1967), Ghanaian hurdler
- Rachel Yankey (born 1979), English footballer
- Yankey Willems (died 1688), Dutch buccaneer
- David Yankey (born 1992), American football player

== See also ==
- Yankee (disambiguation)
