= Mike Garzoni =

American football player (1923–2007)

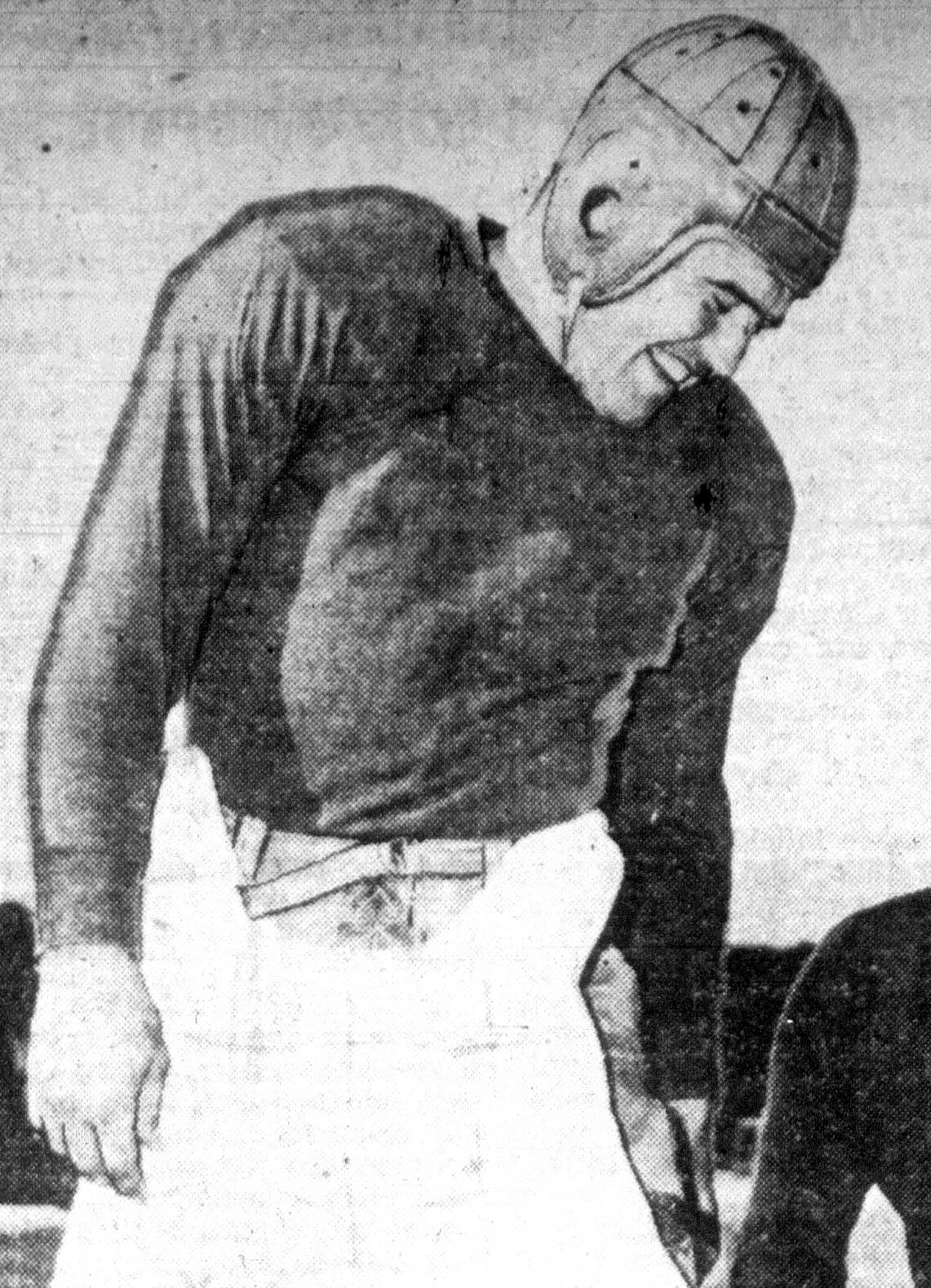
- Garzoni, circa 1943

No. 44, 27, 63, 33
- Position: Guard

Personal information
- Born: August 19, 1921; Oakdale, California, U.S.
- Died: July 18, 2007 (aged 85); Santa Clara, California, U.S.
- Listed height: 5 ft 11 in (1.80 m)
- Listed weight: 218 lb (99 kg)

Career information
- High school: Santa Clara (Oxnard, California)
- College: Fresno State (1942); USC (1943-1946)
- NFL draft: 1947: 6th round, 39th overall pick

Career history
- Washington Redskins (1947); New York Giants (1948); New York Yankees (1949)

Awards and highlights
- First-team All-PCC (1946)

Career NFL/AAFC statistics
- Games played: 17
- Fumble recoveries: 1
- Stats at Pro Football Reference

Michael John Garzoni (August 19, 1921 – July 18, 2007) was an American football offensive lineman in the National Football League (NFL) for the Washington Redskins and the New York Giants. He also played for the New York Yankees in the All-America Football Conference (AAFC).

== Biography ==
Garzoni was born in Oakdale, California, and raised in Santa Clara, the son of Andrea Garzoni and Dosalina Salvadori Garzoni (later Casali). Both of his parents were born in Italy. He served in the United States Navy during World War II. He played college football at Fresno State University and the University of Southern California. He played professional football from 1947 to 1949. After his football career, he owned a gas station in Santa Clara.

Garzoni was briefly married in 1947. In 1957, he married Frances Crane. In 1987, he was inducted into the Santa Clara Hall of Fame. He died in 2007, at the age of 85, in Santa Clara.
