= Joseki (disambiguation) =

Joseki is a sequence of standard moves in the game of Go.

Joseki may also refer to:

- a sequence of standard moves in Shogi
- JOSEKI, a pair of encryption algorithms used by the National Security Agency
