= Yanki =

Yanki or Yankı (Turkish for echo) may refer to:

- Yankī, a type of delinquent youth in Japan

== People with the name ==
- Yankı Erel (born 2000), Turkish tennis player
- Yanki Margalit (born 1962), Israeli entrepreneur
- Yanki Tauber (born 1965), American Jewish-Hasidic scholar
- Semiha Yankı (born 1958), Turkish pop music singer

== See also ==
- Yankee (disambiguation)
