= ANDVT =

Secure voice terminal

The Advanced Narrowband Digital Voice Terminal (ANDVT) is a secure voice terminal for low bandwidth secure voice communications throughout the U.S. Department of Defense. Devices in the ANDVT family include the AN/USC-43 Tactical Terminal (TACTERM), the KY-99A Miniaturized Terminal (MINTERM), and the KY-100 Airborne Terminal (AIRTERM). ANDVT uses LPC-10 voice compression.

The functions of the MINTERM are similar to those of the TACTERM; its updated design includes an improved modular architecture, and it has been reduced in size. The MINTERM is lightweight, low-power, single channel, half-duplex, narrowband/wideband/wireline terminal providing secure voice and data communications with full key distribution and remote rekey capabilities. The MINTERM is certified to secure traffic up to TOP SECRET.

The MINTERM improvements include the following:

- Concurrent voice and data modes enable the users to connect both data equipment and voice handsets.
- VINSON (KY-57/58) mode of operation allows interoperability between the MINTERM and the VINSON wideband COMSEC equipment.
- improved SATCOM performance
- The latest DOD LPC-10 algorithm (V58) which has been enhanced to provide high-quality secure narrowband voice for military handsets and to maintain that quality and intelligibility in noisy acoustical environments.

The AIRTERM is a lightweight, self-contained secure voice and data terminal that provides secure half-duplex voice, digital data, analog data, and remote-keying capabilities for transmission over radio circuits or wireline media. It is a wideband/narrowband terminal that interoperates with the TACTERM, MINTERM, VINSON, and Single Channel Ground and Airborne Radio System (SINCGARS). AIRTERM accepts classified analog voice information and uses LPC-10 at 2.4 kbit/s in narrowband voice modes and continuously variable slope delta (CVSD) modulation at 12 kbit/s and 16 kbit/s in wideband voice modes. The AIRTERM provides the same connectors, with similar functional pinouts, as the VINSON for the wideband operational modes.

== See also ==
- NSA encryption systems
- FNBDT
