= Fortezza =

Information security system

A Fortezza card made by Mykotronx Corp.

Fortezza is an information security system that uses the Fortezza Crypto Card, a PC Card-based security token. It was developed for the U.S. government's Clipper chip project and has been used by the U.S. Government in various applications.

Each individual who is authorized to see protected information is issued a Fortezza card that stores private keys and other data needed to gain access. It contains an NSA approved security microprocessor called Capstone (MYK-80) that implements the Skipjack encryption algorithm.

The original Fortezza card (KOV-8) is a Type 2 product which means it cannot be used for classified information. The most widely used Type 1 encryption card is the KOV-12 Fortezza card which is used extensively for the Defense Message System (DMS). The KOV-12 is cleared up to TOP SECRET/SCI. A later version, called KOV-14 or Fortezza Plus, uses a Krypton microprocessor that implements stronger, Type 1 encryption and may be used for information classified up to TOP SECRET/SCI. It, in turn, is being replaced by the newer KSV-21 PC card with more modern algorithms and additional capabilities. The cards are interchangeable within the many types of equipment that support Fortezza and can be rekeyed and reprogrammed by the owners, making them easy to issue and reuse. This simplifies the process of rekeying equipment for crypto changes: instead of requiring an expensive fill device, a technician is able to put a new Fortezza card in the device's PCMCIA slot.

The Fortezza Plus card and its successors are used with NSA's Secure Terminal Equipment voice and data encryption systems that are replacing the STU-III. It is manufactured by the Mykotronx Corporation and by Spyrus. Each card costs about $240 and they are commonly used with card readers sold by Litronic Corporation.

The Fortezza card has been used in government, military, and banking applications to protect sensitive data.
