= Homer Dudley =

American electronic and acoustic engineer

Homer W. Dudley (14 November 1896 – 18 September 1980) was an American pioneering electronic and acoustic engineer who created the first electronic voice synthesizer for Bell Labs in the 1930s and led the development of a method of sending secure voice transmissions during World War Two. His awards include the Franklin Institute's Stuart Ballantine Medal (1965).

== Early life ==
Born in Virginia, Dudley's family moved to Pennsylvania when he was a schoolboy. His father was a preacher, and his parents also gave lessons to students, in classical and religious subjects. Dudley trained to be a grade school and high school teacher. He found it difficult to keep discipline in the classroom and soon gave up teaching. Intending a change in career, he enrolled in Pennsylvania State University, where he developed an interest in the nascent science of electronic engineering. After taking some college courses in electronic engineering, Dudley found employment with Bell Laboratories, which was at that time a division of Western Electric Company. His career with Bell Labs spanned 40 years, most of it in the Telephone Transmission Division.

== Sound theory ==
Dudley's primary area of exploration was in the idea of human speech being fundamentally the use of a carrier—a more or less continuous sound that is modulated and shaped by the mouth, throat and sinuses into recognizable speech. The vocal cords create a carrier sound which is shaped into formants by the throat, mouth and sinuses into what we recognize as vowel sounds ("aah", "eeh", "ooh", etc.), which are further shaped by plosives (such as pressing the lips together to create a "p" sound) and glottal stops (such as closing the back of the throat to produce a "guh" sound). Dudley theorized that an intelligible analogue to human speech could be created by breaking sound down into modular blocks which could be assembled into a desired order, to allow the production and communication with artificial speech. By replacing the natural carrier sound of human speech with a carrier sound at a higher frequency, speech could be reproduced more clearly over long distances and low volumes, since higher frequency sounds are heard more clearly than lower ones.

== The VOCODER and VODER ==
In 1928, Dudley began experimenting with electromechanical devices to produce analogues of human speech. A key to this process was the development of a parallel band-pass filter, which allowed sounds to be filtered down to a fairly specific portion of the audio spectrum by attenuating the sounds that fall above or below a certain band. This led to the patent for the "Vocoder" (a portmanteau of "voice" and "encoder"), a method of reproducing speech through electronic means, and allowing it to be transmitted over distances, as through telephone lines. By reproducing human speech electronically, the elements of speech could be filtered into ten specific audio spectrum bands, rendering it more easily transmitted over telephone lines with greater clarity and legibility. The speech could also be compressed down to a very narrow frequency band, to allow multiple transmissions simultaneously on different bands. This enabled many telephone conversations to be transmitted at the same time over one line.

With the assistance of fellow engineer Robert Riesz, Dudley created the "VODER" (for "Voice Operation DEmonstratoR"), a console from which an operator could create phrases of speech controlling a VOCODER with a keyboard and foot pedals; it was considered difficult to operate. The VODER was demonstrated at Bell Laboratory exhibits at both the 1939 New York World's Fair and the 1939 Golden Gate International Exposition. With a woman operator sitting behind the console, phrases resembling human speech could be demonstrated to the audience, although the produced sounds were often difficult to understand.

On June 21, 1938 Dudley and Bell Labs were granted U.S. patent 2,121,142 for a "System for the artificial production of vocal or other sounds".

== SIGSALY and wartime projects ==
Dudley worked with Alan Turing on the SIGSALY project for the US Military. SIGSALY was a method of transmitting speech in a secure manner, rendering it unable to be understood by unauthorized listeners. It utilized technology developed in the VOCODER and VODER projects, and added a random noise source as a method of encrypting speech. SIGSALY was successfully used by US military intelligence during World War II for transmitting the highest level of classified messages.

== Later projects ==
Dudley stayed with Bell Labs through the early 1960s. During that time, he invented and refined many of the technologies that became essential for telephony. His development of artificial speech was elaborated upon by others to produce methods of artificial speech for humans unable to use their vocal cords (as with the voice synthesizer used by Stephen Hawking), and by electronic music pioneers Wendy Carlos, Robert Moog and the German musical group Kraftwerk. One of Dudley's final projects was the design of an electronic kit distributed by Bell Labs for home hobbyists and students, called "Speech Synthesis: an Experiment in Electronic Speech Production". The kit contained the components with which to create an electronic circuit that could produce three different speech formants. The kit entered production in 1963 and was produced until the late 1960s.
