= NSA Suite A Cryptography =

Classified U.S. cryptographic algorithms

NSA Suite A Cryptography is NSA cryptography which "contains classified algorithms that will not be released". "Suite A will be used for the protection of some categories of especially sensitive information (a small percentage of the overall national security-related information assurance market)."

Incomplete list of Suite A algorithms
Name	Type	Purpose
ACCORDION	Encryption	Key encryption. In NGLD-M (circa 2019): 1.3 is used for TrKEK (transfer key encryption key) and internal key wrap; 3.0 internal key wrap and KMI Black key wrap
ALDERFLY and ALDERFLY 2	Key exchange	Modern replacement for FIREREFLY and Enhancer FIREFLY
BATON	Block cipher	See article
CDL 1, CDL 2	?	?
FFC	?	?
FIREFLY and Enhanced FIREFLY	Key exchange	?
JOSEKI	?	?
KEESEE	?	?
KM-TG Series	Signature	In NGLD-M: Security-related software
MAYFLY	?	?
MEDLEY	Symmetric encryption	In NGLD-M: Data at Rest (DAR) and non-crypto software
MERCATOR	?	?
SAFEBOX-E, SAFEBOX-F	?	?
SAVILLE	Encryption (1960s)	Voice and data over radio, see article
SHILLELAGH	?	?
SILVER LINING	Signature	In NGLD-M: Security-related software
SPONDULIX-S	Key Agreement	In NGLD-M: KMI
WALBURN	?	?
WATARI	Encryption	In NGLD-M: Security-related software
WEASEL	?	?

== See also ==
- Commercial National Security Algorithm Suite
- NSA Suite B Cryptography
