= Mixed-excitation linear prediction =

Military speech coding standard

Mixed-excitation linear prediction (MELP) is a United States Department of Defense speech coding standard used mainly in military applications and satellite communications, secure voice, and secure radio devices. Its standardization and later development was led and supported by the NSA and NATO. The current "enhanced" version is known as MELPe.

== History ==
The initial MELP was invented by Alan McCree around 1995 while a graduate student at the Center for Signal and Image Processing (CSIP) at Georgia Tech, and the original MELP related patents have expired by now. That initial speech coder was standardized in 1997 and was known as MIL-STD-3005. It surpassed other candidate vocoders in the US DoD competition, including: (a) Frequency Selective Harmonic Coder (FSHC), (b) Advanced Multi-Band Excitation (AMBE), (c) Enhanced Multiband Excitation (EMBE), (d) Sinusoid Transform Coder (STC), and (e) Subband LPC Coder (SBC). Due to its lower complexity than Waveform Interpolative (WI) coder, the MELP vocoder won the DoD competition and was selected for MIL-STD-3005.

=== MIL-STD-3005 ===
Between 1998 and 2001, a new MELP-based vocoder was created at half the rate (i.e. 1200 bit/s), and substantial enhancements were added to the MIL-STD-3005 by SignalCom (later acquired by Microsoft), Compandent, and AT&T Corporation, which included (a) additional new vocoder at half the rate (i.e. 1200 bit/s), (b) substantially improved encoding (analysis), (c) substantially improved decoding (synthesis), (d) Noise-Preprocessing for removing background noise, (e) transcoding between the 2400 bit/s and 1200 bit/s bitstreams, and (f) new postfilter. This fairly significant development was aimed to create a new coder at half the rate and have it interoperable with the old MELP standard. This enhanced-MELP (also known as MELPe) was adopted as the new MIL-STD-3005 in 2001 in form of annexes and supplements made to the original MIL-STD-3005, enabling the same quality as the old 2400 bit/s MELP's at half the rate. One of the greatest advantages of the new 2400 bit/s MELPe is that it shares the same bit format as MELP, and hence can interoperate with legacy MELP systems, but would deliver better quality at both ends. MELPe provides much better quality than all older military standards, especially in noisy environments such as battlefield and vehicles and aircraft.

=== STANAG-4591 (NATO) ===
In 2002, following extensive competition and testing, the 2400 and 1200 bit/s US DoD MELPe was adopted also as NATO standard, known as STANAG-4591. The NATO testing performance measurements included voice intelligibility, voice quality, speaker recognition, language dependency, speaker dependency, 10 acoustic noise environments, transmission channel under 1% BER, tandem using 16 kbit/s CVSD vocoder, whispered speech, and real-time implementation. The testing data included Over 36,000 files, or 500 hours of speech under various conditions and languages. As part of NATO testing for new NATO standard, MELPe was tested against other candidates such as France's HSX (Harmonic Stochastic eXcitation) and Turkey's SB-LPC (Split-Band Linear Predictive Coding), as well as the old secure voice standards such as FS1015 LPC-10e (2.4 kbit/s), FS1016 CELP (4.8 kbit/s) and CVSD (16 kbit/s). Subsequently, the MELPe won also the NATO competition, surpassing the quality of all other candidates as well as the quality of all old secure voice standards (CVSD, CELP and LPC-10e). The NATO competition concluded that MELPe substantially improved performance (in terms of speech quality, intelligibility, and noise immunity), while reducing throughput requirements. The NATO testing also included interoperability tests, used over 200 hours of speech data, and was conducted by 3 test laboratories worldwide. Compandent Inc, as a part of MELPe-based projects performed for NSA and NATO, provided NSA and NATO with special test-bed platform known as MELCODER device that provided the golden reference for real-time implementation of MELPe. The low-cost FLEXI-232 Data Terminal Equipment (DTE) made by Compandent, which are based on the MELCODER golden reference, are very popular and widely used for evaluating and testing MELPe in real-time, various channels & networks, and field conditions.

In 2005, a new 600 bit/s rate MELPe variation by Thales Group (France) was added (without extensive competition and testing as performed for the 2400/1200 bit/s MELPe) to the NATO standard STANAG-4591.

=== 300 bit/s MELP ===
In 2010, MIT Lincoln Labs, Compandent, BBN, and General Dynamics also developed for DARPA a 300 bit/s MELP device . Its quality was better than the 600 bit/s MELPe, but its algorithmic delay was longer.

== Implementations ==
The MELPe has been implemented in many applications including secure radio devices, satellite communications, VoIP, and cellphone applications. In such applications, additional expertise is required for combating channel errors, packet loss, and synchronization loss. Such expertise requires the understanding of the MELPe's bits sensitivity to errors. The 2400 bit/s and 1200 bit/s MELPe include synchronization bit, which is useful in serial communications.

== Compression level ==
MELPe is intended for the compression of speech. Given an audio input sampled at 8 kHz, the MELPe codec yields the following compression ratios over a 64 kbit/s μ-Law G.711 datastream, discounting the effects of protocol overhead:

Bitrate	Compression ratio over G.711	Payload size	Payload interval
2400 bit/s	26.7 X	54 bits	22.5 ms
1200 bit/s	53.3 X	81 bits	67.5 ms
600 bit/s	106.7 X	54 bits	90 ms

Generally, speech coding involves a trade-off of different aspects including bit-rate, speech quality, delay (frame size and lookahead), computational complexity, robustness to different speakers and languages, robustness to different background noises, channel error robustness, and also codec state recovery in the face of packet loss. Since the MELPe's lower rates (600 and 1200 bit/s) are supersets of the 2400 bit/s rate, the algorithm complexity (e.g. in MIPS) is about the same for all rates. The lower rates use increased frames and lookahead, as well as codebook size, therefore they require more memory.

== Intellectual property rights ==
MELPe (and/or its derivatives) is subject to IPR licensing from the following companies, Texas Instruments (2400 bit/s MELP algorithm / source code), Microsoft (1200 bit/s transcoder), Thales Group (600 bit/s rate), Compandent, and AT&T (Noise Pre-Processor NPP).

== See also ==
- CVSD
- LPC-10e
- FS-1015
- FS-1016
- Secure Voice
- Vocoder
