= Vocoder =

Voice encryption, transformation, and synthesis device

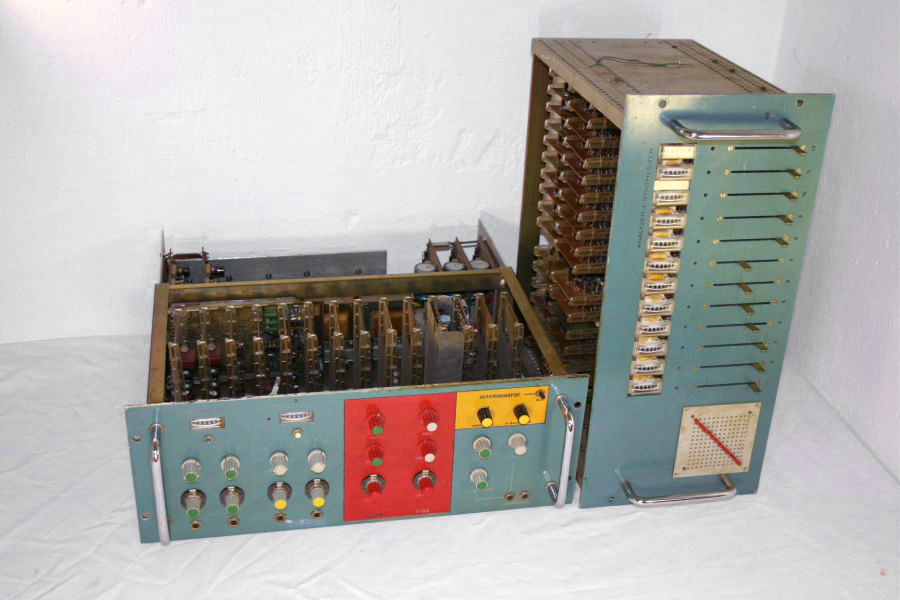
Early 1970s vocoder, custom-built for electronic music band Kraftwerk

A vocoder (/ˈvoʊkoʊdər/, a portmanteau of voice and encoder) is a category of speech coding that analyzes and synthesizes the human voice signal for audio data compression, multiplexing, voice encryption or voice transformation.

The vocoder was invented in 1937 by Homer Dudley at Bell Labs as a means of synthesizing human speech. This work was developed into the channel vocoder which was used as a voice codec for telecommunications for speech coding to conserve bandwidth in transmission.

By encrypting the control signals, voice transmission can be secured against interception. Its primary use in this fashion is for secure radio communication. The advantage of this method of encryption is that none of the original signal is sent, only envelopes of the bandpass filters. The receiving unit needs to be set up in the same filter configuration to re-synthesize a version of the original signal spectrum.

The vocoder has also been used extensively as an electronic musical instrument. The decoder portion of the vocoder, called a voder, can be used independently for speech synthesis.

== Theory ==
The human voice consists of sounds generated by the periodic opening and closing of the glottis by the vocal cords, which produces an acoustic waveform with many harmonics. This initial sound is then filtered by movements in the nose, mouth and throat (a complicated resonant piping system known as the vocal tract) to produce fluctuations in harmonic content (formants) in a controlled way, creating the wide variety of sounds used in speech. There is another set of sounds, known as the unvoiced and plosive sounds, which are created or modified by a variety of sound-generating disruptions of airflow occurring in the vocal tract.

The vocoder analyzes speech by measuring how its spectral energy distribution characteristics fluctuate across time. This analysis results in a set of temporally parallel envelope signals, each representing the individual frequency band amplitudes of the user's speech. Put another way, the voice signal is divided into a number of frequency bands (the larger this number, the more accurate the analysis) and the level of signal present at each frequency band, occurring simultaneously, is measured by an envelope follower, representing the spectral energy distribution across time. This set of envelope amplitude signals is called the "modulator". To recreate speech, the vocoder reverses the analysis process, variably filtering an initial broadband noise (referred to alternately as the "source" or "carrier"), by passing it through a set of band-pass filters, whose individual envelope amplitude levels are controlled, in real time, by the set of envelope amplitude signals from the modulator.

The digital encoding process involves a periodic analysis of each of the modulator's multiband set of envelope amplitudes. This analysis results in a set of digital pulse code modulation stream readings. Then the pulse code modulation stream outputs of each band are transmitted to a decoder. The decoder applies the pulse code modulations as control signals to the corresponding amplifiers of the output filter channels.

Information about the fundamental frequency of the initial voice signal (as distinct from its spectral characteristic) is discarded; it was not important to preserve this for the vocoder's original use as an encryption aid. It is this dehumanizing aspect of the vocoding process that has made it useful in creating special voice effects in popular music and audio entertainment.

Instead of a point-by-point recreation of the waveform, the vocoder process sends only the parameters of the vocal model over the communication link. Since the parameters change slowly compared to the original speech waveform, the bandwidth required to transmit speech can be reduced. This allows more speech channels to utilize a given communication channel, such as a radio channel or a submarine cable.

Analog vocoders typically analyze an incoming signal by splitting the signal into multiple tuned frequency bands or ranges. To reconstruct the signal, a carrier signal is sent through a series of these tuned band-pass filters. In the example of a typical robot voice the carrier is noise or a sawtooth waveform. There are usually between 8 and 20 bands.

The amplitude of the modulator for each of the individual analysis bands generates a voltage that is used to control amplifiers for each of the corresponding carrier bands. The result is that frequency components of the modulating signal are mapped onto the carrier signal as discrete amplitude changes in each of the frequency bands.

Often there is an unvoiced band or sibilance channel. This is for frequencies that are outside the analysis bands for typical speech but are still important in speech. Examples are words that start with the letters s, f, ch or any other sibilant sound. Using this band produces recognizable speech, although somewhat mechanical sounding. Vocoders often include a second system for generating unvoiced sounds, using a noise generator instead of the fundamental frequency. This is mixed with the carrier output to increase clarity.

In the channel vocoder algorithm, among the two components of an analytic signal, considering only the amplitude component and simply ignoring the phase component tends to result in an unclear voice; on methods for rectifying this, see phase vocoder.

== History ==
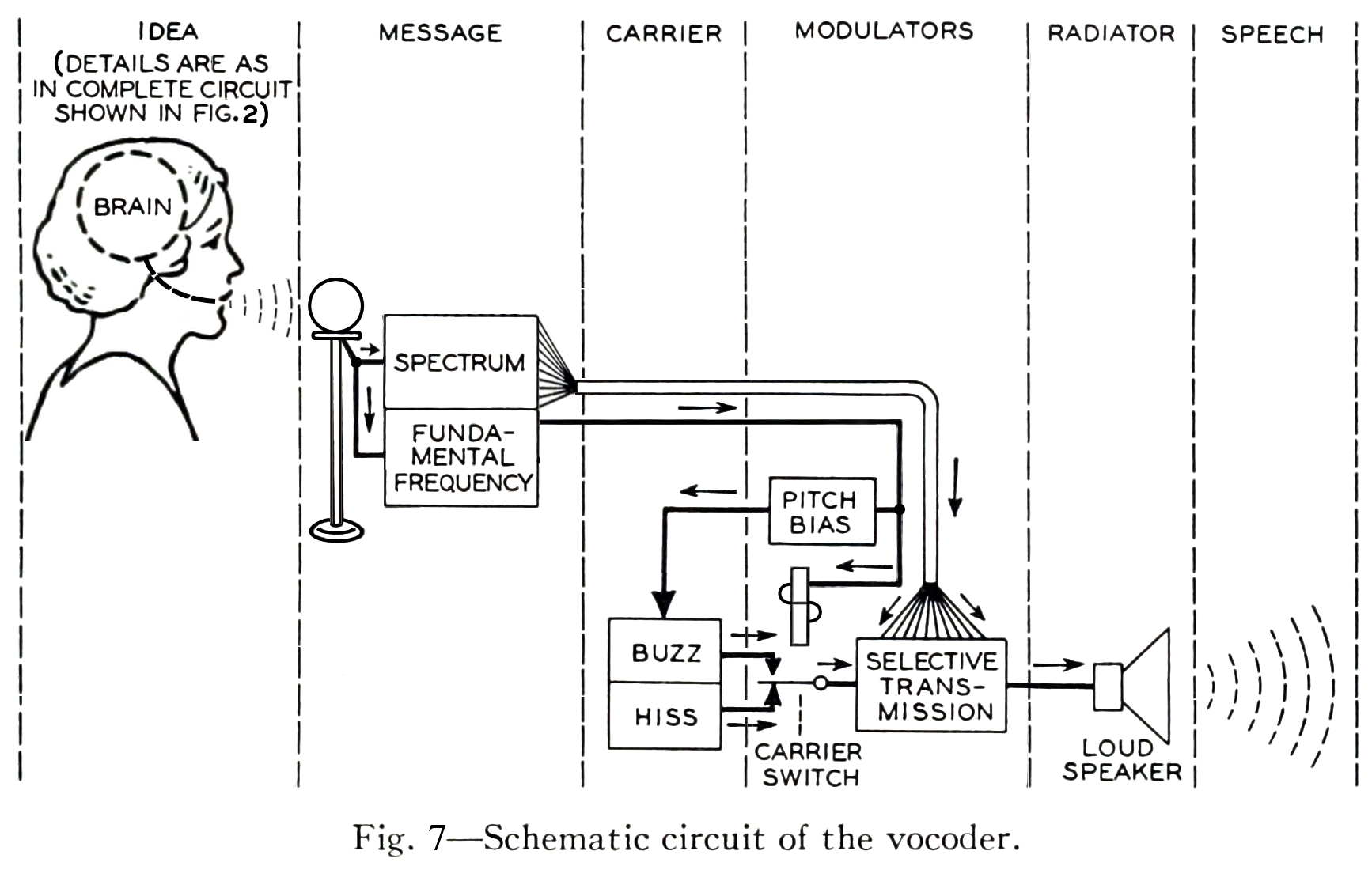
Schematic circuit of Dudley's Vocoder (based on: Dudley 1940, p. 508, Fig.7)

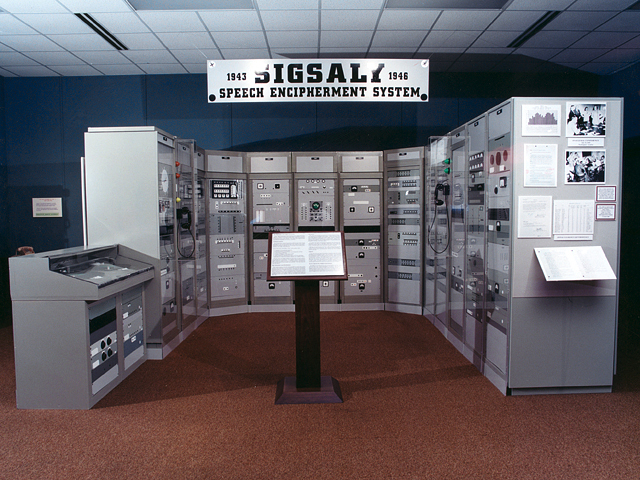
SIGSALY (1943–1946) speech encipherment system

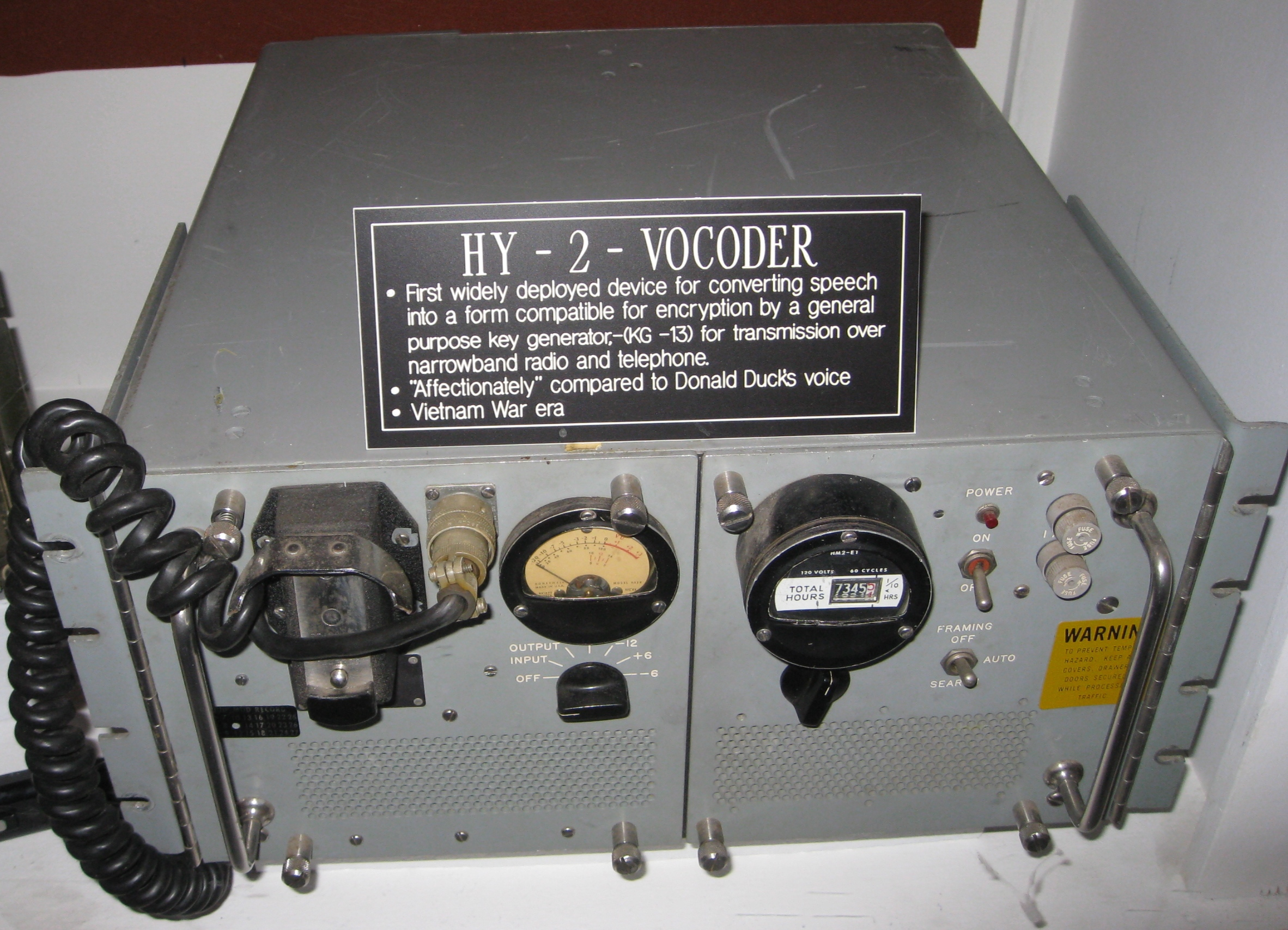
HY-2 Vocoder (designed in 1961) was the last generation of channel vocoder in the US.

The development of a vocoder was started in 1928 by Bell Labs engineer Homer Dudley, who was granted patents for it on March 21, 1939, and Nov 16, 1937.

To demonstrate the speech synthesis ability of its decoder section, the voder (voice operating demonstrator) was introduced to the public at the AT&T building at the 1939–1940 New York World's Fair. The voder consisted of an electronic oscillator – a sound source of pitched tone – and a noise generator for hiss, 10 bands of resonator filters, each controlled by a variable-gain amplifier as a vocal tract, and the manual controllers including a set of pressure-sensitive keys for filter control, and a foot pedal for pitch control of tone. The filters controlled by keys convert the tone and the hiss into vowels, consonants, and inflections. This was a complex machine to operate, but a skilled operator could produce recognizable speech. (Note: One Of The First Vocoder Machine [sic] (Motion picture). c. 1939. A demonstration of the voder (not the vocoder).)

Dudley's vocoder was used in the SIGSALY system, which was built by Bell Labs engineers in 1943. SIGSALY was used for encrypted voice communications during World War II. The KO-6 voice coder was released in 1949 in limited quantities; it was a close approximation to the SIGSALY at 1200 bit/s. In 1953, KY-9 THESEUS 1650 bit/s voice coder used solid-state logic to reduce the weight to 565 pounds (256 kg) from SIGSALY's 55 short tons (50,000 kg), and in 1961 the HY-2 voice coder, a 16-channel 2400 bit/s system, weighed 100 pounds (45 kg) and was the last implementation of a channel vocoder in a secure speech system.

Later work in this field has since used digital speech coding. The most widely used speech coding technique is linear predictive coding (LPC). Another speech coding technique, adaptive differential pulse-code modulation (ADPCM), was developed by P. Cummiskey, Nikil S. Jayant and James L. Flanagan at Bell Labs in 1973.

== Applications ==
- Terminal equipment for systems based on digital mobile radio (DMR).
- Digital voice scrambling and encryption
- Cochlear implants: noise and tone vocoding is used to simulate the effects of cochlear implants.
- Musical and other artistic effects

== Modern implementations ==
Even with the need to record several frequencies and additional unvoiced sounds, the compression of vocoder systems is impressive. Standard speech-recording systems capture frequencies from about 500 to 3,400 Hz, where most of the frequencies used in speech lie, typically using a sampling rate of 8 kHz (slightly greater than the Nyquist rate). The sampling resolution is typically 8 or more bits per sample, for a data rate in the range of 64 kbit/s, but a good vocoder can provide a reasonably good simulation of voice with as little as 5 kbit/s of data.

Toll quality voice coders, such as ITU G.729, are used in many telephone networks. G.729 in particular has a final data rate of 8 kbit/s with superb voice quality. G.723 achieves slightly worse quality at data rates of 5.3 and 6.4 kbit/s. Many voice vocoder systems use lower data rates, but below 5 kbit/s voice quality begins to drop rapidly.

Several vocoder systems are used in NSA encryption systems:

- LPC-10, FIPS Pub 137, 2400 bit/s, which uses linear predictive coding
- Code-excited linear prediction (CELP), 2400 and 4800 bit/s, Federal Standard 1016, used in STU-III
- Continuously variable slope delta modulation (CVSD), 16 kbit/s, used in wide band encryptors such as the KY-57.
- Mixed-excitation linear prediction (MELP), MIL STD 3005, 2400 bit/s, used in the Future Narrowband Digital Terminal FNBDT, NSA's 21st century secure telephone.
- Adaptive Differential Pulse Code Modulation (ADPCM), former ITU-T G.721, 32 kbit/s used in STE secure telephone (Note: ADPCM is not a proper vocoder but rather a waveform codec. ITU has gathered G.721 along with some other ADPCM codecs into G.726.)

Modern vocoders that are used in communication equipment and in voice storage devices today are based on the following algorithms:

- Algebraic code-excited linear prediction (ACELP 4.7–24 kbit/s)
- Mixed-excitation linear prediction (MELPe 2400, 1200 and 600 bit/s)
- Multi-band excitation (AMBE 2000 bit/s – 9600 bit/s)
- Sinusoidal-Pulsed Representation (SPR 600 bit/s – 4800 bit/s)
- Robust Advanced Low-complexity Waveform Interpolation (RALCWI 2050, 2400 and 2750 bit/s)
- Tri-Wave Excited Linear Prediction (TWELP 300–9600 bit/s)
- Noise Robust Vocoder (NRV 300 and 800 bit/s)

Vocoders are also currently used in psychophysics, linguistics, computational neuroscience and cochlear implant research.

=== Linear prediction-based ===
Since the late 1970s, most non-musical vocoders have been implemented using linear prediction, whereby the target signal's spectral envelope (formant) is estimated by an all-pole IIR filter. In linear prediction coding, the all-pole filter replaces the bandpass filter bank of its predecessor and is used at the encoder to whiten the signal (i.e., flatten the spectrum) and again at the decoder to re-apply the spectral shape of the target speech signal.

One advantage of this type of filtering is that the location of the linear predictor's spectral peaks is entirely determined by the target signal and can be as precise as allowed by the time period to be filtered. This is in contrast with vocoders realized using fixed-width filter banks, where the location of spectral peaks is constrained by the available fixed frequency bands. LP filtering also has disadvantages in that signals with a large number of constituent frequencies may exceed the number of frequencies that can be represented by the linear prediction filter. This restriction is the primary reason that LP coding is almost always used in tandem with other methods in high-compression voice coders.

=== Waveform-interpolative ===
Waveform-interpolative (WI) vocoder was developed at AT&T Bell Laboratories around 1995 by W.B. Kleijn, and subsequently, a low-complexity version was developed by AT&T for the DoD secure vocoder competition. Notable enhancements to the WI coder were made at the University of California, Santa Barbara. AT&T holds the core patents related to WI and other institutes hold additional patents.

== Artistic effects ==
=== Uses in music ===
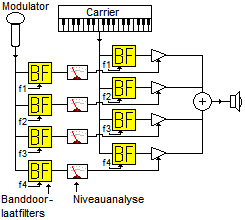
Channel vocoder setting as a musical application; the Dutch captions are "Band-pass filters" and "Level meters".

For musical applications, a source of musical sounds is used as the carrier, instead of extracting the fundamental frequency. For instance, one could use the sound of a synthesizer as the input to the filter bank, a technique that became popular in the 1970s.

==== History ====
Werner Meyer-Eppler, a German scientist with a special interest in electronic voice synthesis, published a thesis in 1948 on electronic music and speech synthesis from the viewpoint of sound synthesis. Later he was instrumental in the founding of the Studio for Electronic Music of WDR in Cologne, in 1951.

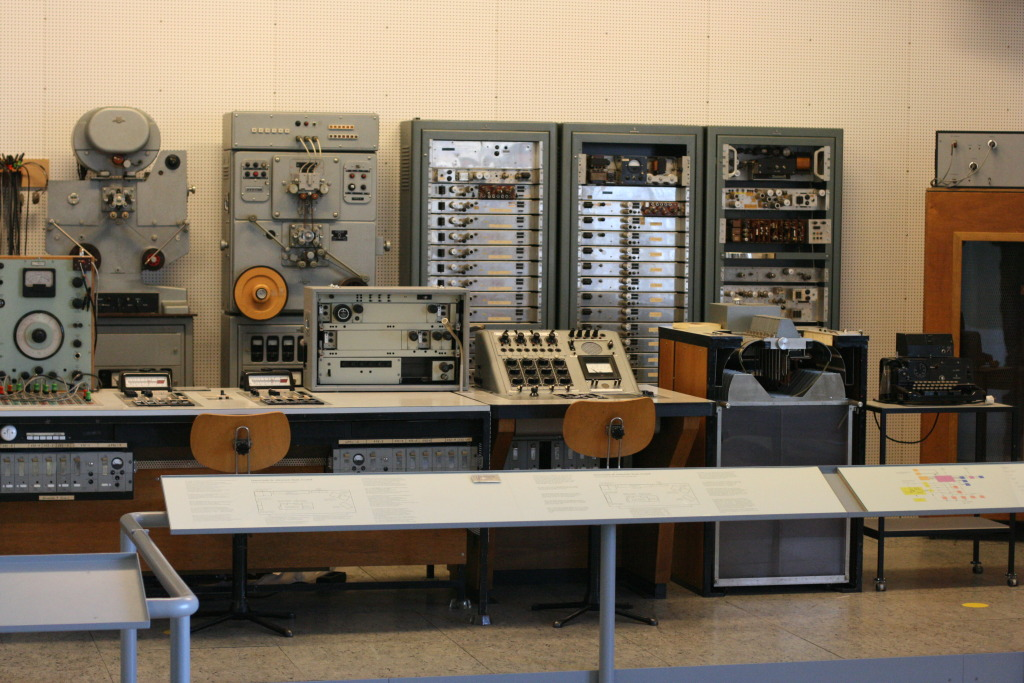
Siemens Synthesizer (c. 1959) at Siemens Studio for Electronic Music was one of the first attempts to use a vocoder (rear) to create music.

One of the first attempts to use a vocoder in creating music was the Siemens Synthesizer at the Siemens Studio for Electronic Music, developed between 1956 and 1959. (Note: Siemens Electronic Music Studio in Deutsches Museum (multi part) (Video). Details of the Siemens Electronic Music Studio, exhibited at the Deutsches Museum.)

In 1968, Robert Moog developed one of the first solid-state musical vocoders for the electronic music studio of the University at Buffalo.

In 1968, Bruce Haack built a prototype vocoder, named Farad after Michael Faraday. It was first featured on "The Electronic Record For Children" released in 1969 and then on his rock album The Electric Lucifer released in 1970. (Note: Bruce Haack (1970). Electric to Me Turn – from "The Electric Lucifer" (Phonograph). Columbia Records. A sample of an earlier Vocoder.)

Vocoder effects have been used by musicians in both electronic music and as a special effect, along with more traditional instruments. In 1969, Sly and the Family Stone used it in "Sex Machine", a song on the album Stand!. Other artists have made vocoders an essential part of their music, overall or during an extended phase. Examples include the German synthpop group Kraftwerk, US funk band Midnight Star ("Freak-A-Zoid"), Stevie Wonder ("Send One Your Love", "A Seed's a Star") and jazz/fusion keyboardist Herbie Hancock during his late 1970s period. In 1982 Neil Young used a Sennheiser Vocoder VSM201 on six of the nine tracks on Trans. The chorus and bridge of Michael Jackson's "P.Y.T. (Pretty Young Thing)" features a vocoder ("Pretty young thing/You make me sing"), courtesy of session musician Michael Boddicker.

Among the most consistent users of the vocoder in emulating the human voice was Daft Punk, who used this instrument from their first album, Homework (1997), to their final one, Random Access Memories (2013); the duo described the convergence of technological and human voice "the identity of their musical project". For instance, the lyrics of "Around the World" (1997) are integrally vocoder-processed, "Get Lucky" (2013) features a mix of natural and processed human voices, and "Instant Crush" (2013) features Julian Casablancas singing into a vocoder.

=== Voice effects in other arts ===
Robot voices became a recurring element in popular music during the 20th century. Apart from vocoders, several other methods of producing variations on this effect include: the Sonovox, Talk box, Auto-Tune, (Note: T-Pain (2005). I'm Sprung (CD Single/Download). Jive Records. (A sample of Auto-Tune effect (a.k.a. T-Pain effect).)) linear prediction vocoders, speech synthesis, (Note: Earlier Computer Speech Synthesis (Audio). AT&T Bell Labs. c. 1961. (A sample of earlier computer-based speech synthesis and song synthesis, by John Larry Kelly, Jr. and Louis Gerstman at Bell Labs, using IBM 704 computer. The demo song "Daisy Bell", musical accompanied by Max Mathews, impressed Arthur C. Clarke and later he used it in the climactic scene of the screenplay for his novel 2001: A Space Odyssey.)) (Note: TI Speak & Spell (Video). Texas Instruments. c. 1980. A sample of speech synthesis.) ring modulation and comb filter.

Example of vocoder
Demonstration of the "robotic voice" effect found in film and television

Vocoders are used in television production, filmmaking and games, usually for robots or talking computers. The robot voices of the Cylons in Battlestar Galactica were created with an EMS Vocoder 2000. The 1980 version of the Doctor Who theme, as arranged and recorded by Peter Howell, has a section of the main melody generated by a Roland SVC-350 vocoder. A similar Roland VP-330 vocoder was used to create the voice of Soundwave, a character from the Transformers series.

== See also ==
- Audio time stretching and pitch scaling
- List of vocoders
- Silent speech interface
