= Yanki Margalit =

Israeli businessman

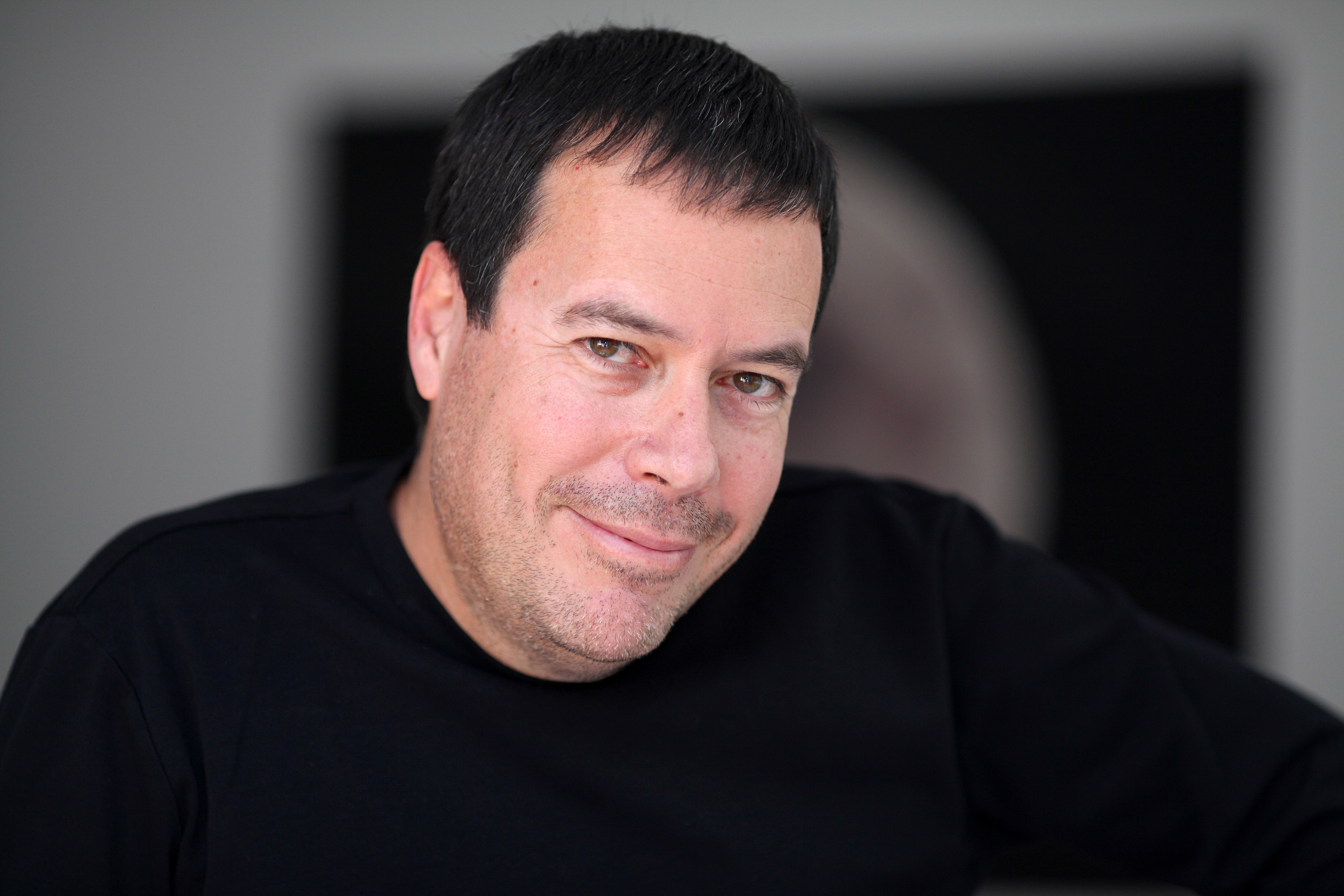
Yanki Margalit

Yanki Margalit (Hebrew: ינקי מרגלית) is an Israeli entrepreneur and speaker best known for starting Aladdin Knowledge Systems. He was the Chairman SpaceIL, a non-profit space technology organization competing for the Google Lunar X Prize. He is also a partner in Innodo, a seed investment fund.

Margalit is on the boards of Idealist.org, Latet, College4all.org, Meet.mit.edu, Adama.org.il and SpaceIL.com

== Early life ==
Margalit was raised in Bat Yam, a suburb of Tel Aviv. At the age of 11, he and his younger brother Oded were identified as exceptionally intelligent children and they were invited to join special classes for gifted children. As a teenager, he was interested in the emerging discipline of computer science. In 1977, at the age of 15, he built his first computer together with his brother, Oded Margalit.

== Career ==
=== Aladdin Knowledge Systems ===
In 1985, Margalit founded Aladdin Knowledge Systems Ltd. In its early years the company developed two product lines, an artificial intelligence package (which was dropped early on) and a hardware product to prevent unauthorized software copying, similar to digital rights management. Margalit raised just $10,000 as initial capital for the company.

His brothers Danny Margalit and Gady Margalit have joined Aladdin as CTO and IT directors. The digital rights management product by 1993 generated sales of $4,000,000. The same year that company had an initial public offering on NASDAQ raising $7,900,000.

In 1996 Aladdin has acquired FAST software Security in Germany and in 1998 Aladdin acquired ESafe Technologies. In 2004 the company's shares were also listed on the Tel Aviv Stock Exchange.

In 2006 Aladdin acquired California-based Preview Systems and in 2008 Aladdin acquired SafeWord. By 2008 the company's annual revenues reached over $125 million. In mid-2008, Vector Capital attempted to purchase Aladdin. Vector initially offered $14.50 per share, but Aladdin's founder Margalit refused the offer. Aladdin's shareholders agreed on the merger in February 2009 at $11.50 per share, in cash. In March 2009, with close to $150M in sales, Vector Capital acquired Aladdin and officially merged it with SafeNet.

=== Lectures ===
Margalit has appeared as a professional speaker about technology, entrepreneurship, innovation, and human evolution, while studying and working in more recent interests of biotechnology, clean energy and space exploration.

Some of his lectures include:

- Homo-Sapiens 2.0 – talk at DOKU:TECH
- The future of the future – on Singularity, evolution and technology.
- On entrepreneurship and innovation.
- Space-IL – Towards landing a spaceship on the moon.
- Dream it – Make it! – A TEDxJerusalem talk on DIY and the Makers Movement.

=== CheckPoint Software Technologies ===
When they were still a startup, CheckPoint Software Technologies offered Margalit half of the company for $200,000. He refused the offer and often regards it as his biggest regret in life, considering the market cap of CheckPoint is $12,000,000,000 as of 2014.
