= KOV-14 =

US NSA-approved PC card

The KOV-14 Fortezza Plus is a US National Security Agency-approved PC card which provides encryption functions and key storage to Secure Terminal Equipment and other devices. It is a tamper-resistant module based on the Mykotronx Krypton chip, including all of the cryptographic functionality of the original Fortezza card plus the Type 1 algorithms/protocols BATON and Firefly, the SDNS signature algorithm, and the STU-III protocol. It was developed by Mykotronx as part of the NSA's MISSI program. As of 2008, the KOV-14 is beginning to be phased out and replaced by the backwards compatible KSV-21 PC card.
