= Damn Yankees (disambiguation) =

Damn Yankees may refer to:

- Damn Yankees, a musical comedy with a book by George Abbott and Douglass Wallop and music and lyrics by Richard Adler and Jerry Ross
- Damn Yankees (film), a 1958 musical film based on the musical comedy of the same name
- Damn Yankees (band), an American hard rock supergroup
  - Damn Yankees (album), their 1990 debut album

== See also ==
- Damnyankee
- Carpetbagger
- New York Yankees (disambiguation)
