= Capstone (cryptography) =

US government standardization project

Capstone is a United States government long-term project to develop cryptography standards for public and government use. Capstone was authorized by the Computer Security Act of 1987, driven by the National Institute of Standards and Technology (NIST) and the National Security Agency (NSA); the project began in 1993.

== Project ==
The initiative involved four standard algorithms: a data encryption algorithm called Skipjack, along with the Clipper chip that included the Skipjack algorithm, a digital signature algorithm, Digital Signature Algorithm (DSA), a hash function, SHA-1, and a key exchange protocol. Capstone's first implementation was in the Fortezza PCMCIA card. All Capstone components were designed to provide 80-bit security.

The initiative encountered massive resistance from the cryptographic community, and eventually the US government abandoned the effort. The main reasons for this resistance were concerns about Skipjack's design, which was classified, and the use of key escrow in the Clipper chip.
