= Aladdin Knowledge Systems =

Business enterprise

Aladdin Knowledge Systems Ltd.
- Type: Private
- Traded as: Nasdaq: ALDN; TASE: ALDN
- Industry: Security Software & Services
- Founded: 1985; 41 years ago
- Founder: Jacob (Yanki) Margalit and Tzvi Popowski
- Fate: Acquired by SafeNet
- Headquarters: Belcamp, Maryland, U.S.
- Products: eToken, eSafe, Hardlock, HASP
- Revenue: ▲US$ 105.9 million (2007)
- Operating income: ▲$ 13.911 million (2007)
- Net income: ▲$ 14.888 million (2007)
- Number of employees: 464

Aladdin Knowledge Systems Ltd. was a company that produced software for digital rights management and Internet security. The company was acquired by Safenet Inc, in 2009. Its corporate headquarters are located in Belcamp, Maryland.

== History ==
Aladdin Knowledge Systems was founded in 1985 by Jacob (Yanki) Margalit, when he was 23 years old; he was soon joined by his brother Danny Margalit, who took the responsibility for product development at the age of 18, while at the same time completing a Mathematics and Computer Science degree at Tel Aviv University. In its early years the company developed two product lines, an artificial intelligence package (which was dropped early on) and a hardware product to prevent unauthorized software copying, similar to digital rights management (DRM). Margalit raised just $10,000 as an initial capital for the company.

The digital rights management product became a success and by 1993 generated sales of $4,000,000. The same year that company had an initial public offering on NASDAQ raising $7,900,000. In 2004 the company's shares were also listed on the Tel Aviv Stock Exchange. By 2007 the company's annual revenues reached over $105 million.

In mid-2008, Vector Capital was attempting to purchase Aladdin. Vector initially offered $14.50 per share, but Aladdin's founder Margalit refused the offer arguing that the company was worth more. Aladdin's shareholders agreed on the merger in February 2009 at $11.50 per share, in cash. In March 2009, Vector Capital acquired Aladdin and officially merged it with SafeNet.

=== Corporate timeline ===
- 1985 – Aladdin Knowledge Systems was established
- 1993 – Aladdin held an initial public offering
- 1996 – Aladdin acquired the German company FAST
- 1998 – Aladdin patented USB smart card-based authentication tokens
- 1998_Dec – Aladdin acquired the software protection business of EliaShim
- 1999 – Aladdin acquired the eSafe "content security" business of EliaShim
- 2000 – Aladdin acquired 10% of Comsec
- 2001 – Aladdin acquired the ESD assets of Preview Systems
- 2005 – Aladdin completed second offering – 2,000,000 shares with net proceeds of $39m
- 2009 – Aladdin was acquired by Vector Capital.
- 2010 – Aladdin was merged with Vector Capital's SafeNet.

== Products ==
=== DRM ===
Aladdin's HASP product line is a DRM suite of protection and licensing software with 40% global market share, used by over 30,000 software publishers. It is used across many platforms (Windows, Linux, Mac).

HASP, which stands for Hardware Against Software Piracy, was the company's first product and evolved into a complete digital rights management suite, that includes a software only option and a back office management application, in recent years also software as a service capability.

=== Internet security ===
In the late 1990s the company started diversifying and began offering Internet security and network security products, offering two product lines:

==== Digital identity management ====
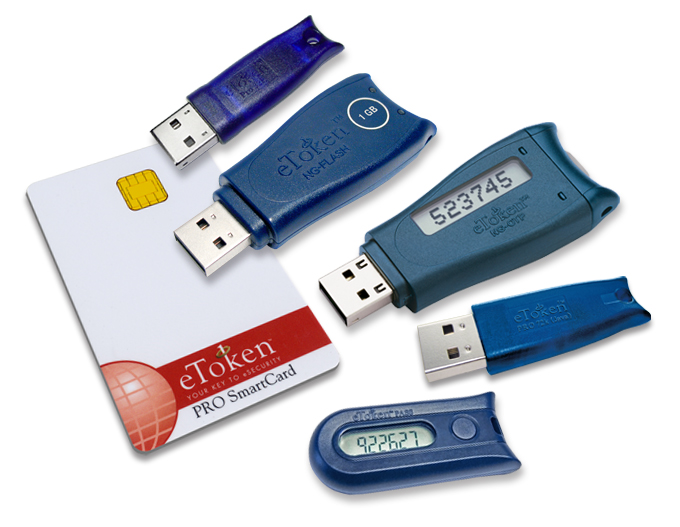
Six models of eTokens

eToken, portable device for two-factor authentication, pasdigital identity management, mainly deployed as a USB token.

==== Network security ====
eSafe a line of integrated network security and content filtering products, protecting networks against cracked and pirated Internet-borne software.

== See also ==
- Product activation
- License manager
- List of license managers
- Floating licensing
- Silicon Wadi
