= Thales Defense & Security =

Manufacturer of tactical communications equipment

Thales Defense & Security, Inc.
- Formerly: Thales Communications Inc.
- Company type: Subsidiary
- Industry: Military Communications
- Headquarters: Clarksburg, Maryland, U.S.
- Key people: Mike Sheehan (CEO and president)
- Products: MBITR, JEM, IMBITR
- Parent: Thales Group
- Website: www.thalesdsi.com

Thales Defense & Security, Inc. (formerly Thales Communications Inc.) is a subsidiary of the Thales Group, is a leading manufacturer of tactical communications equipment, including the AN/PRC-148 MBITR and JEM (JTRS Enhanced Module), currently fielded with the US Army and NATO forces worldwide. It is currently involved in the Joint Tactical Radio System program, fielding its JEM MBITR radio.
