= Sectéra Secure Module =

Family of secure communications products

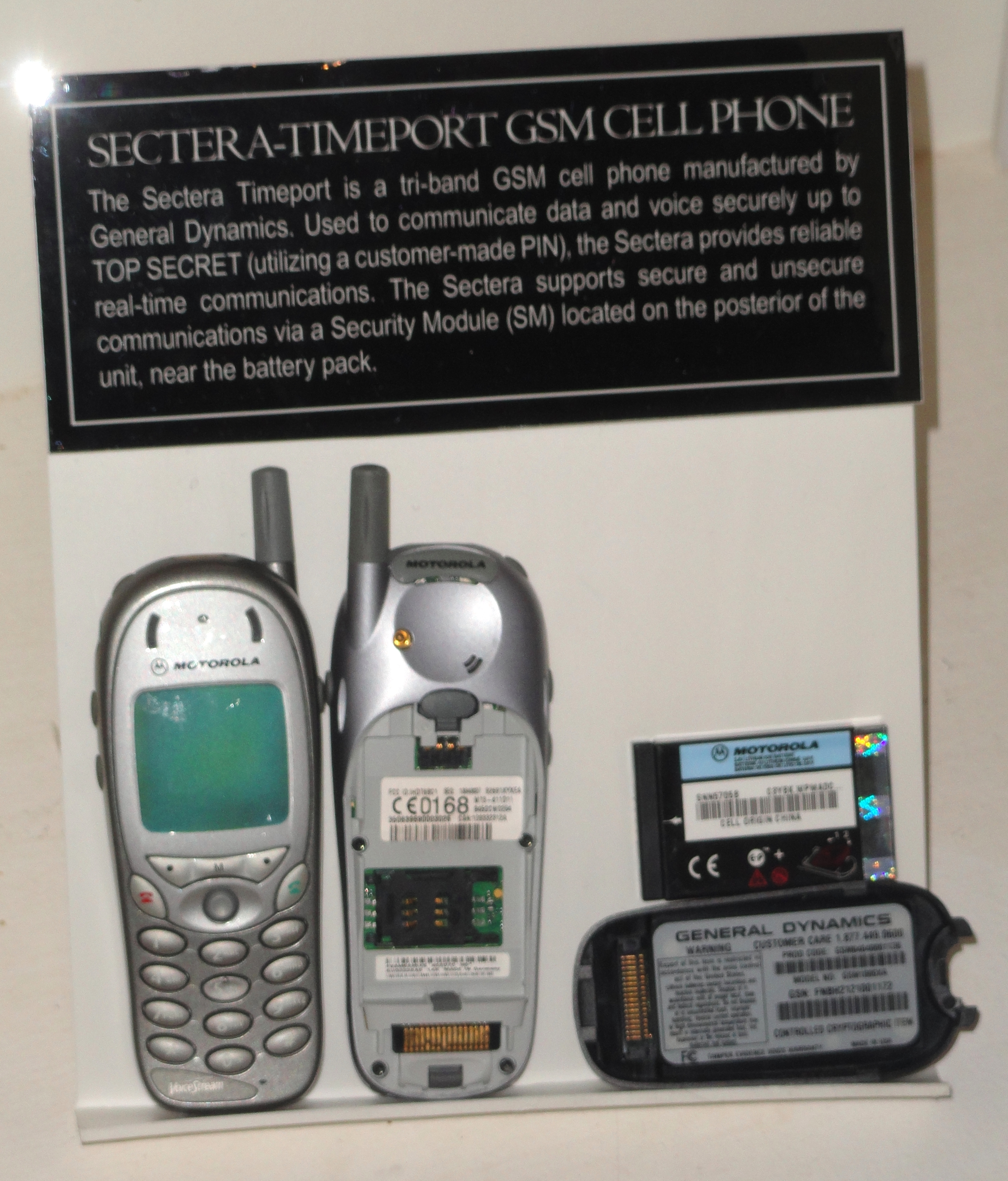
- Sectéra phone with its Security Module
- Manufacturer: General Dynamics Mission Systems
- Compatible networks: GSM, CDMA and Wi-Fi
- Battery: Lithium-Ion

Sectéra is a family of secure voice and data communications products produced by General Dynamics Mission Systems which are approved by the United States National Security Agency. Devices can use either National Institute of Standards and Technology (NIST) Advanced Encryption Standard (AES) or SCIP to provide Type-1 encryption, with communication levels classified up to Top Secret. The devices are activated with a Personal Identification Number (PIN).

== Sectéra Secure Module ==
The Sectéra Secure Module is a device that can provide encryption of voice and data. It is used in the Sectéra Wireline Terminal for use with PSTN devices and has been incorporated into a slim module to use with a Motorola GSM cell phone. The module is placed between the battery and the body of the phone. The phone may be used as a regular GSM phone when the security module is not activated by the PIN.

== Sectéra Edge ==
Another member of the Sectéra family, Sectéra Edge, is a smart phone that supports voice and data communication, including access to the SIPRNET.

The Sectéra Edge was developed by General Dynamics under an $18 million contract from the National Security Agency.

It was reported in 2009 that the Sectéra Edge could possibly replace President Barack Obama's BlackBerry in providing secure communications. Instead of the Sectéra Edge, a standard BlackBerry device was secured with the SecurVoice encryption software.

The Sectéra Edge was discontinued in 2015.
