= NSA cryptography =

Cryptography practises of the USA's National Security Agency

The vast majority of the National Security Agency's work on encryption is classified, but from time to time NSA participates in standards processes or otherwise publishes information about its cryptographic algorithms. The NSA has categorized encryption items into four product types, and algorithms into two suites. The following is a brief and incomplete summary of public knowledge about NSA algorithms and protocols.

== Type 1 Product ==
A Type 1 Product refers to an NSA endorsed classified or controlled cryptographic item for classified or sensitive U.S. government information, including cryptographic equipment, assembly or component classified or certified by NSA for encrypting and decrypting classified and sensitive national security information when appropriately keyed.

Name	Type	Specification	Use	Equipment (incomplete list)
ACCORDIAN [sic]		R21-TECH-13-00, "ACCORDIAN 3.0 Specification" (August 2000)		AIM (1999 and 2004 brochures), SafeXcel-3340, PSIAM
AES (256-bit keys only)	Block cipher	FIPS 197	Numerous	Numerous
BATON	Block cipher		Various	PKCS#11, CDSA/CSSM, AIM (1999 and 2004 brochures), CYPRIS, APCO Project 25, MYK-85, Fortezza Plus, SecNet-11, Sierra, SafeXcel-3340, PSIAM
BAYLESS				CYPRIS
BYTEMAN				CYPRIS
CARDIGAN				CYPRIS
CARDHOLDER			Satellite uplink command encryption	CYPRIS, KI-17, U-AYJ Flight Decrypt Chip (Cardholder), Flight Encrypt Chip (Cardholder), MYK-16, CXS-810, CXS-2000, MCU-100, MCU-600
CARIBOU			Satellite uplink command encryption	U-TXZ, MYK-15A
CRAYON				AIM (2004 brochure), CYPRIS (4 modes)
FASTHASH	Cryptographic hash function		MISSI Type 1 hash	PKCS #11, CDSA/CSSM
FIREFLY / Enhanced FIREFLY			EKMS public-key cooperative key generation	AIM (2004), SafeXcel-3340, SecNet54, ViaSat KG-25x, PSIAM
GOODSPEED				Sierra II
HAVE QUICK			Antijam, LPI/LPD airborne voice communication	CYPRIS
JACKNIFE				AIM (2004) for IFF Mode 5
JOSEKI		R21-TECH-0062-92, "JOSEKI-1, A Bootstrap Procedures" (Oct. 1992) (also R21-TECH-13-97, R21-TECH-13-98)	Protection of secret algorithms in firmware	AIM, PSIAM
JUNIPER	Block cipher			PKCS #11, CDSA/CSSM
KEESEE				AIM (1999 and 2004 brochures), CYPRIS, PSIAM
Mark XII IFF			IFF secondary radar	AIM (2004 brochure)
MAYFLY	Asymmetric-key algorithm			PKCS #11, CDSA/CSSM
MEDLEY		R21-TECH-30-01, "MEDLEY Implementation Standard" (Nov. 2001)		AIM (2004), SecNet 54, SafeXcel-3340, ViaSat KG25x, PSIAM
PEGASUS			Satellite telemetry and mission data downlinks	KG-227, KG-228, KI-17, U-BLW Pegasus Space Microcircuit Chip, U-BLX Pegasus Ground Microcircuit Chip, MYK-17, CXS-810, CXS-2000, MCU-100, MCU-600
PHALANX				AIM (1999 and 2004 brochures), CYPRIS (PHALANX I and PHALANX II)
SAVILLE			Low-bandwidth voice (and sometimes data) encryption	AIM (1999 and 2004 brochures), CYPRIS (2 modes), Windster (SAVILLE I), VINSON
VALLOR			TTY broadcasts to submarines	AIM (2004)
WALBURN			High-bandwidth link encryption	AIM (2004), KG-81/94/194/95
PADSTONE				CYPRIS (2 modes), Windster, Indictor
WEASEL				SafeXcel-3340

== Type 2 Product ==
A Type 2 Product refers to an NSA endorsed unclassified cryptographic equipment, assemblies or components for sensitive but unclassified U.S. government information.

Name	Type	Specification	Use	Equipment (incomplete list)
CORDOBA				CYPRIS, Windster, Indictor
KEA	Asymmetric-key algorithm	R21-Tech-23-94, "Key Exchange Algorithm (KEA)"	Key exchange and digital signature algorithm for Fortezza, etc.	Fortezza, Fortezza Plus, Palladium Secure Modem
SKIPJACK	Block cipher	R21-Tech-044-91, "SKIPJACK"	Confidentiality algorithm for Fortezza, etc.	Fortezza, Fortezza Plus, Palladium Secure Modem

== Type 3 Product ==
Unclassified cryptographic equipment, assembly, or component used, when appropriately keyed, for encrypting or decrypting unclassified sensitive U.S. Government or commercial information, and to protect systems requiring protection mechanisms consistent with standard commercial practices. A Type 3 Algorithm refers to NIST endorsed algorithms, registered and FIPS published, for sensitive but unclassified U.S. government and commercial information.

	Name	Type	Specification	Use	Equipment (incomplete list)
DES	Data Encryption Standard	Block cipher	FIPS 46-3	Ubiquitous	Ubiquitous
AES	Advanced Encryption Standard	Block cipher	FIPS 197	Numerous	Numerous
DSA	Digital Signature Algorithm	Digital signature system	FIPS 186	Numerous	Numerous
SHA	Secure Hash Algorithm	Cryptographic hash function	FIPS 180-2	Ubiquitous	Ubiquitous

== Type 4 Product ==
A Type 4 Algorithm refers to algorithms that are registered by the NIST but are not FIPS published. Unevaluated commercial cryptographic equipment, assemblies, or components that are neither NSA nor NIST certified for any Government usage.

== Algorithm Suites ==
=== Suite A ===
A set of NSA unpublished algorithms that is intended for highly sensitive communication and critical authentication systems.

=== Suite B ===
A set of NSA endorsed cryptographic algorithms for use as an interoperable cryptographic base for both unclassified information and most classified information. Suite B was announced on 16 February 2005, and phased out in 2016.

=== Commercial National Security Algorithm Suite ===
A set of cryptographic algorithms promulgated by the National Security Agency as a replacement for NSA Suite B Cryptography until post-quantum cryptography standards are promulgated.

=== Quantum resistant suite ===
In August 2015, NSA announced that it is planning to transition "in the not distant future" to a new cipher suite that is resistant to quantum attacks. "Unfortunately, the growth of elliptic curve use has bumped up against the fact of continued progress in the research on quantum computing, necessitating a re-evaluation of our cryptographic strategy." NSA advised: "For those partners and vendors that have not yet made the transition to Suite B algorithms, we recommend not making a significant expenditure to do so at this point but instead to prepare for the upcoming quantum resistant algorithm transition."

== See also ==
- NSA encryption systems
- Speck and Simon, light-weight block ciphers, published by NSA in 2013
