= Thales Italia Chieti Site =

Thales Italia Spa - Chieti.
- Company type: Private
- Industry: Military Communications
- Headquarters: Chieti, Italy
- Products: ST@RMille, MELANIE H_N
- Parent: Thales Group

Thales Italia Spa - Chieti Site, a subsidiary of the Thales Group, has been until 2016 a leading manufacturer of tactical communications equipment, including the ST@RMille, TR@CER, MELANIE Systems and ESTHER CBRN Systems currently fielded with the Italian Army and NATO forces worldwide. It is currently involved in the Joint Tactical Radio System program, fielding its radios.

The plant started its activity in 1973 as the "defence division" of Telettra, one of the Italian leading companies into the TLC business, later acquired by Alcatel. The development of skills in the HF Radio sector and the acquisition of an important “1 kW HF Radio Stations” contract for the Italian Army, under the licence of THOMSON-CSF, contributed to making Chieti a “Centre of HF Radio Excellence” in Italy.

In the second half of the 1970s, alongside HF communication radio products, a new electronic war systems sector was also developed (HF Rhino Radio Jammers).

In the 1980s, thanks to collaboration with many of the most important Italian universities, an original Telecommunications System with Advanced Electronic Counter-Countermeasure (ECCM) Techniques on the VHF range was designed and created while, at the same time the opportunity to develop a new, important trend in the Strategic Communication and Command & Control Networks was identified on the market. Playing on the know-how acquired, Telettra became one of the main partners of the following Italian industrial associations: CATRIN (Tactical Systems), MARTE (Strategic Systems).

In 1991, ALCATEL acquired the ownership of Telettra and the Chieti site saw its presence in the Tactical Systems (SCRA, Supervision of Tactical Networks) and Strategic Systems (SHF radio links) sectors strengthened.

At the start of the 21st century, the Chieti plant became a Division of Thales Italia and, making use of its technical skills and developing the ability to attract financing for technological research, it launched a new product policy, rising up the value scale, or rather from products to systems, up to services.

On a product level, the success of the Chieti site is based on technology and innovation, key factors in its competitiveness.

The ST@Rmille UHF squad/platoon radio (which became an “Italian” product featured in the Thales Group catalogue) is an example of “Tactical communications”, while the power component (C- RCIED) for the HF/VHF/UHF vehicle/convoy protective jammer is an example of “Electronic War”.

On a systems level, a new strategy was put in place, envisaging on one hand updates to existing systems (such as the 400W HF Stations in “Tactical communications” or the Smart Rhino HF jammer in “Electronic War” and on the other the challenge of opening up new fronts on dual markets (such as NBC Tactical Laboratories, in Nuclear, Bacteriological and Chemical Systems, or C2 Vehicles for the Fire Brigade in “Command & Control systems).

Finally, on a services level, after having developed and supplied the infrastructural backbone of Italian telecommunications to the Italian Armed Forces since the 1990s, the Thales Italia site in Chieti now manages the maintenance of two of the main National Networks, via radio links and optical fibres respectively. Joint Forces Numerical Network (RNI) and Italian Joint Forces Optical Fibre Network (RIFON).

Since 2016, the site in Chieti (the only building owned by the company), counting about one hundred employees, more than 60 working in research and development, has been dismissed by Thales Group. After the decision of Thales Italy S.p.A. to close down its business operations in the industrial area of Chieti Scalo, TEKNE srl, a medium size Italian company, specialized in design and production of custom electronic systems, advanced technological solutions and systems, military and industrial vehicles, started a project that involved the acquisition of the remaining human resources of the Thales site. This was due to its interest in inheriting Thales site ICT and Defence & Security competences, in order to join the Internet of Things trend in the automotive context and expand internal know-how by strengthening their skills and moving them from automotive to ICT.
