= ESafe =

Antivirus software

- Industry: Computer security software
- Predecessor: Eliashim Antivirus
- Headquarters: Haifa, Israel
- Products: SafeNet eSafe Content Security
- Parent: Aladdin Knowledge Systems
- Website: www.safenet-inc.com/products/content_security/index.asp

ESafe Protect (eSafe, formerly known as EliaShim Antivirus) is a range of software security products developed by EliaShim Limited, based in Haifa, Israel. The distribution of the products is managed by eSafe Technologies Inc, located in Seattle, United States.

== History ==
EliaShim was acquired by Aladdin Knowledge Systems in December 1998. The distribution of the consumer desktop version, eSafe Protect, was managed by Aladdin Knowledge Systems until its discontinuation in 2002.

In the following years, the eSafe brand had transformed into a gateway-based content security product, which Aladdin Knowledge Systems sold as an integrated security appliance.

In March 2009, Aladdin Knowledge Systems merged eSafe Protect with SafeNet Inc., which led to the evolution of eSafe into the SafeNet eSafe Content Security product line.

== See also ==
- SafeNet
- Surfshark Antivirus

== Sources ==
- SafeNet Website
