= CYPRIS (microchip) =

CYPRIS (cryptographic RISC microprocessor) was a cryptographic processor developed by the Lockheed Martin Advanced Technology Laboratories. The device was designed to implement NSA encryption algorithms and had a similar intent to the AIM and Sierra crypto modules. However, the principal references date back to the late 1990s and it does not appear that the CYPRIS ever earned NSA's Type 1 certification, without which it could not be used to protect classified government traffic.

According to a manufacturer presentation,

CYPRIS was designed to address the cryptographic requirements of military software radios and wireless systems. Designed under an NSA contract, CYPRIS was optimized to implement a variety of legacy COMSEC and TRANSEC algorithms while enabling field upgrades to new and emerging INFOSEC algorithms.

CYPRIS contains a high performance RISC core, a reconfigurable hardware unit, and a suite of programmable and automatic system check features. Unprogrammed, CYPRIS is an unclassified, non CCI, exportable device; when programmed it assumes the classification of its software.

Over 20 core cryptoalgorithms were developed on CYPRIS.
