= FS-1016 =

FS-1016 (also called FED-STD-1016) is a deprecated secure telephony speech encoding standard for Code-excited linear prediction (CELP) developed by the United States Department of Defense and finalized February 14, 1991.

Unlike the vocoder used in FS-1015, CELP provides more natural speech. However, due to quite low bit rate and early development (1991), the speech quality is very noisy and below that of commercial cellular speech codec, such as AMR. FS-1016 is no longer used since its follow-up MELP provides better performance in all applications.

== Technical details ==
The bit rate of the codec is 4.8 kbit/s. The complexity of the codec is 19 MIPS. The RAM requirement is 1.5 kilobytes. Frame size of the codec is 30 ms. Look-ahead of 7.5 ms is also required.

The variation of CELP used in the FS-1016 is so-called ternary codebook, meaning that all excitation amplitudes are either +1, −1 or 0. The sub frame gain is calculated and sent to the receiver.
