= Yanqi =

Yanqi may refer to the following in China:

== Xinjiang ==
- Karasahr (焉耆), ancient kingdom
- Yanqi Hui Autonomous County (焉耆回族自治县), in Bayin'gholin Mongol Autonomous Prefecture

== Elsewhere ==
- Yanqi, Beijing (雁栖), in Huairou District, Beijing
