= SafeNet =

Information security company

SafeNet, Inc.
- Type: Subsidiary
- Industry: Information security
- Founded: 1983; 43 years ago, in Timonium, Maryland
- Fate: Acquired by Thales Group on 2019
- Headquarters: Belcamp, Maryland, United States
- Area served: Worldwide
- Products: Encryption, Semiconductor IP, software monetization, Software as a Service, hardware security modules, authentication, security tokens
- Number of employees: 1,600 (2011)
- Parent: Thales Group
- Divisions: Data Protection, Software Monetization
- Website: safenet-inc.com at the Wayback Machine (archived 2010-12-03)

SafeNet, Inc. was an information security company based in Belcamp, Maryland, United States, which was acquired in August 2014 by the French security company Gemalto. Gemalto was, in turn, acquired by Thales Group in 2019. The former SafeNet's products include solutions for enterprise authentication, data encryption, and key management. SafeNet's software monetization products are sold under the Thales Sentinel brand.

SafeNet was notably one of the largest suppliers of encryption technology to the United States Government.

On 8 August 2014, Gemalto announced that it had signed a definitive agreement to acquire 100% of the share capital of SafeNet from Vector Capital for US$890 million on a debt free/cash free basis. A subsequent acquisition of Gemalto by Thales Group was completed on 2 April 2019.

== History ==
- 1983: SafeNet, Inc is founded in 1983 in Timonium, MD as Industrial Resource Engineering by two former NSA engineers, Alan Hastings and Douglas Kozlay.
- 1986: Anthony A. Caputo becomes a silent investor in the company.
- 1987: Anthony Caputo takes the helm of the company as CEO and changes the name to Information Resource Engineering.
- 1988: Lawrence Livermore Labs becomes IRE's first major customer. The company moves its operations to White Marsh, MD.
- 1989: IRE goes public in an IPO initially trading on the OTC pink sheets.
- 1989: IRE rapidly becomes the leader in banking communications security with seven of the top ten U.S. banks as customers and encryption devices used by SWIFT (global interbank transfer system). An end-to-end encryption system was developed that secured data over an X.25 public network, providing the world's first "virtual private network." Early adopters included the Bank of Montreal and Citibank.
- 1994: IRE acquires Connective Strategies, Inc., a manufacturer of voice and data ISDN products founded by its CEO, Charles Brown.
- October 1995: IRE acquires Swiss crypto manufacturer Gretag Data Systems for $4 million.
- 1996: MCI Communications launches the first commercial VPN service using SafeNet VPN technology developed by Charles Brown of SafeNet and Vinton Cerf of MCI. SafeNet is adopted by thirteen of the top fifteen U.S. banks within two years.
- 1997: IRE stock plunges 50% in one day on the announcement of the restructuring of the MCI contract.
- July 1998: Major shareholder fails in a hostile takeover attempt of IRE.
- 2000: IRE is renamed SafeNet, Inc. after the VPN product line.
- 2001: Company co-founder Doug Kozlay leaves SafeNet to form Biometric Associates, a technology company focused on biometric-based authentication and identity solutions.
- 2002: SafeNet acquires a Dutch company Securealink. With the collapse of the tech "bubble," SafeNet, as a public company with a strong sales channel, was able to acquire a series of promising security companies at deep discounts.
- February 2003: SafeNet acquires Cylink and Raqia Networks
- October 2003: SafeNet acquires the OEM business of SSH Communications Security
- November 2003: SafeNet moves its corporate offices to Belcamp, MD.
- March 2004: SafeNet acquires Rainbow Technologies.
- December 2004: SafeNet acquires Datakey, Inc
- April 2005: SafeNet acquires DMDSecure B.V.
- June 2005: SafeNet acquires MediaSentry
- December 2005: SafeNet acquires Eracom Technologies AG
- 2006: SafeNet was involved in the options backdating controversy. As a result, both the chief executive officer and the chief financial officer resigned, and in 2008 the company's former CFO was sentenced to six months in prison for manipulating employee stock options.
- April 2007: California-based financial company Vector Capital buys Safenet for $634 million, making it private
- April 2008: SafeNet acquires Ingrian Networks, Inc.
- May 2008: SafeNet acquires Beep Science AS
- April 2009: SafeNet sells MediaSentry to ArtistDirect
- December 2009: SafeNet acquires Assured Decisions, LLC
- December 2012: SafeNet sells its Government Solutions business unit to Raytheon
- August 2014: SafeNet announces it is to be acquired by Gemalto by the 4Q of 2014
- February 2015: SafeNet Assured Technologies is launched as a fully owned subsidiary of Gemalto to provide high-assurance data security products and technologies to the U.S. Government.
- April 2019: Thales Group closes the acquisition of Gemalto. Thales Cloud Protection and Licensing were formed to serve the global community, and SafeNet Assured Technologies, the entity serving the U.S. Government, becomes Thales Trusted Cyber Technologies.

== Current and former subsidiaries ==
The former Rainbow Technologies subsidiary SafeNet Government Solutions, formerly SafeNet Mykotronx, is still based in Torrance, California with offices in Irvine, California and Columbia, Maryland. The company was founded in 1979 as Myko Enterprises. It changed its name to Mykotronx, Inc in 1987 and merged with SafeNet as part of the SafeNet merger with Rainbow in 2004. SafeNet Government Solutions, LLC has been operationally merged into SafeNet and the lines between the two organizations have been intentionally blurred due to financial reasons. SafeNet Government Solutions is no longer considered a subsidiary. SafeNet Government Solutions provides information security and communications security technology for the US government. The firm has an indefinite-delivery, indefinite-quantity contract for its KIV-7 line of commercial off-the-shelf cryptographic devices that provide protection for digital and voice communications through TOP SECRET, used by agencies such as the National Security Agency (NSA) and the National Reconnaissance Office. Other products include the KOV-14 Fortezza Plus PC card which was developed as part of the NSA's NSSI program and is used on Secure Terminal Equipment. They previously developed the Clipper chip.

In 2009, Vector Capital acquired Aladdin Knowledge Systems, and placed it under SafeNet with the annotation of 'under common management'. In 2010, the two companies were officially merged.
