= New York Yankees (disambiguation) =

The New York Yankees are a Major League Baseball team.

New York Yankees may also refer to:

== American football ==
- New York Yankees (NFL), played in the first American Football League (AFL) in 1926, before competing in the NFL from 1927 to 1929
- New York Yankees (1936 AFL), played in the second AFL, in 1936 and 1937
- New York Yankees (1940 AFL), played in the third AFL, in 1940
- New York Yankees (1941), short-lived member of the American Association
- New York Yankees (AAFC), played during 1946–1949 in the All-America Football Conference

== Other sports ==
- New York Yankees (soccer), team in the American Soccer League in 1931
- New York Yankees (basketball), team in the American Basketball League during the 1937–38 season
