= FIPS 137 =

Telephony speech encoding standard

FIPS 137, originally issued as FED-STD-1015, is a secure telephony speech encoding standard for Linear Predictive Coding vocoder developed by the United States Department of Defense and finished on November 28, 1984. It was based on the earlier STANAG 4198 promulgated by NATO on February 13, 1984.

FED-STD-1015 was re-designated Federal Information Processing Standard (FIPS) Publication 137, (FIPS PUB 137) on October 20, 1988.

It is also known as "LPC-10".

The codec uses a bit rate of 2.4 kbit/s, requiring 20 MIPS of processing power, 2 kilobytes of RAM and features a frame size of 22.5 ms. Additionally, the codec requires a large lookahead of 90 ms.

In 1998, an improved version of the standard was introduced. With a longer super frame structure and better VQ quantizer, the bit rate is reduced to 800 bit/s.
