= Secure Terminal Equipment =

Encrypted telephone system

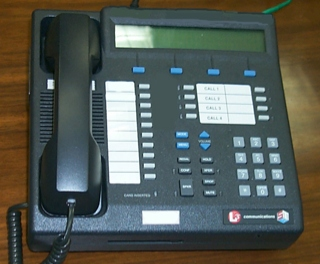
STE desk set. Note slot in front for Crypto PC Card.

Secure Terminal Equipment (STE) is the U.S. government's current (as of 2008) encrypted telephone communications system for wired or "landline" communications. STE is designed to use ISDN telephone lines which offer higher speeds of up to 128 kbit/s and are all digital. The greater bandwidth allows higher quality voice and can also be utilized for data and fax transmission through a built-in RS-232 port. STE is intended to replace the older STU-III office system and the KY-68 tactical system. STE sets are backwards compatible with STU-III phones, but not with KY-68 sets.

STE sets look like ordinary high-end office desk telephones and can place unsecured calls to anywhere on the public switched telephone network (PSTN), as well as secured calls on it via the phone's backwards compatible STU-III mode. There is a PC Card slot in the STE that allows a Fortezza Plus (KOV-14) Crypto Card or KSV-21 Enhanced Crypto Card to be inserted. When an NSA-configured Crypto Card is present, secure calls can be placed to other STE phones. STE phones are "releasable" (unlike STU-III sets). All cryptographic algorithms are in the crypto card.

Newer STE sets can communicate with systems that use the Secure Communications Interoperability Protocol (SCIP) (formerly Future Narrowband Digital Terminal (FNBDT)). There are upgrade kits available for older units.

== Models ==
- Office: The Office STE is the most widely used STE and provides voice and data access to ISDN (Integrated Services Digital Network) and PSTN (Public Switched Telephone Network) telecommunications systems.
- Tactical: The Tactical STE is similar to the Office STE but can also access the TRI-TAC (TRI Service TACtical) network and has a serial EIA-530A/EIA-232 BDI (Black Digital Interface) port.
- Data: The Data STE provides remote access for voice, fax, data and video-conferencing. This model has two serial EIA-530A/EIA-232 BDI ports and allows for data transfers to multiple destinations.
- C2: The C2 STE is similar to the Tactical STE but C2 has modified software for use with its Tactical Terminal Locking Handset mechanism.
- STE-R: Similar to the Data STE, the STE-Remote provides dial-in access to the Defense Red Switch Network (DRSN).
- VoIP: The STE now has Voice over Internet Protocol (VoIP) capability, available as an upgrade to the current models, or built into some new models.

As of 2007, a typical STE terminal cost about $3,100, not including the crypto card.
