= AN/VRC-12 =

Type of VHF radio

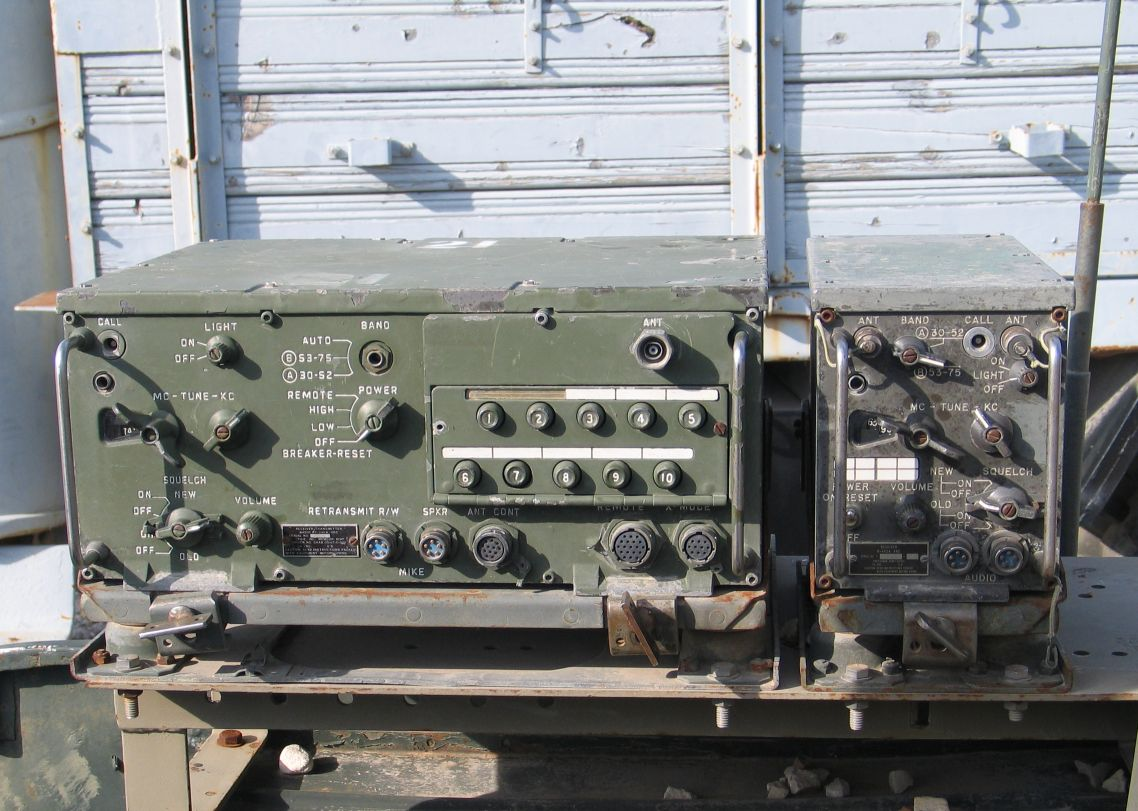
AN/VRC-12 consisting of RT-246 receiver-transmitter and R-442 receiver, at Yad La-Shiryon Museum, Israel

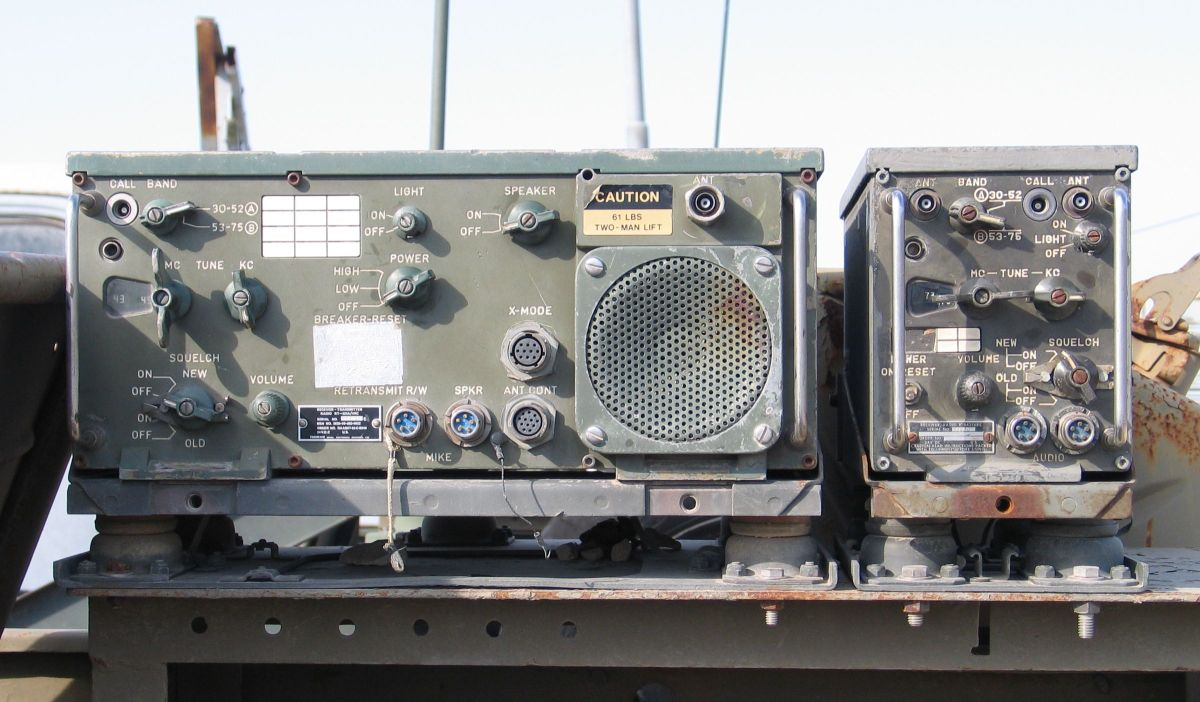
AN/VRC-47 consisting of RT-524 receiver-transmitter and R-442 receiver at Yad La-Shiryon Museum

The AN/VRC-12 is the lowest-numbered element of a family of vehicular VHF-FM synthesized vehicular radio communications systems developed by Avco Corporation and introduced around 1963 and used extensively by the U.S. military during the Vietnam War and for many years after. It replaced the earlier AN/GRC-3 through 8 series and was, in turn, replaced by the Single Channel Ground and Airborne Radio System (SINCGARS) in the early 1990s. The sets were manufactured by its original developer, Avco based in Cincinnati, Ohio (originally by its Electronic & Ordnance Div., Evendale, Ohio), and Magnavox, Ft. Wayne, Indiana (with LTV Electrosystems, Inc. and Memcor, Inc., supplying certain components, such as receivers and transmitters.) Texas Instruments was one of the principal bidders that proposed improved, ultra-reliable (failure-free) variant of VRC-12 in the late 1960s, but failed to win the competition. RCA bid for ultra-reliable variant in the early 1970s was also unsuccessful.

In accordance with the Joint Electronics Type Designation System (JETDS), the "AN/VRC-12" designation represents the 12th design of an Army-Navy electronic device for vehicle two-way communications radio. The JETDS system also now is used to name all Department of Defense electronic systems.

== Background ==
The older AN/GRC-3 to 8 series was configured from three different transceivers:

- The RT-66/GRC covered the armor band 20 MHz - 27.9 MHz
- The RT-67/GRC covered the artillery band 27 MHz - 38.9 MHz
- The RT-68/GRC covered the infantry band 38 MHz - 54.9 MHz

Each transceiver weighed 215 lb and occupied 2.5 cubic feet. Power output was 15 to 20 Watts, yielding a 15-mile range. Frequency spacing was 100 kHz. There was limited overlap between armor and artillery radios, and between artillery and infantry radios, but none between armor and infantry.

The transceivers in the new AN/VRC-12 series were half the size and weight of the GRC-3x series, output twice the power, yet covered all frequencies in the larger 30 to 76 MHz FM band and provided 920 channels, vs 350 with the GRC-3 series.

== Technical details ==
The VRC-12 series includes the VRC-12 and VRC-43 to 49. which consist of various combinations of three basic components, two receiver-transmitter models, the RT-246 and the RT-524, and an auxiliary receiver, the R-442. The RT-246 can select one of ten frequencies preset by the operator. The operator has to select each frequency manually on the RT-524, which has a built-in loudspeaker in the space occupied by push buttons on the RT-246. The RT-524 was developed primarily for use in vehicles where the operator could reach the control panel easily; the RT-246 was designed for use in tracked vehicles where the operator could not reach the control panel. In Vietnam these radios were often removed from vehicles for use in bases such as forward tactical command posts. In most cases, major tactical units were issued the VRC-12 family of radios just before or shortly after their deployment to Vietnam during 1965 and 1966.

AN/VRC-12 family configurations
System	Components
AN/VRC-12	RT-246 + R-442
AN/VRC-43	RT-246
AN/VRC-44	RT-246 + R-442 + R-442
AN/VRC-45	RT-246 + RT-246
AN/VRC-46	RT-524
AN/VRC-47	RT-524 + R-442
AN/VRC-48	RT-524 + R-442 + R-442
AN/VRC-49	RT-524 + RT-524

The radios contained 100 transistors and 8 vacuum tubes and were modular in design, allowing most servicing to be done with only a screw driver. Later upgrades replaced the vacuum tubes with transistors. A variety of accessories were available, including antennas, control heads, encryptors, head sets, shock mounts, speakers and interconnecting cables.

Technical characteristics
Channels:	920 channels across two bands using 50 kHz steps
Frequency Ranges:	30.00 to 52.95 MHz (Low Channel); 53.00 to 75.95 MHz (High Channel)
Estimated Range:	25-30 mi (40–48 km) Dependent on conditions (less in jungle)
Power Output:	35 to 40 watts
Power Source:	Vehicle power or generators
Antenna:	AT-912/VRC or AS-1729/VRC for mobile use, RC-292 for fixed
Type of Service:	30K0F3E (FM) vehicular radio
Weight:	100 lb (45 kg)
Security	Could be used with TSEC/KY-8 or KY-38 NESTOR and, later, the KY-57 VINSON secure voice systems

== See also ==
- List of military electronics of the United States
- AN/PRC-77 Portable Transceiver – Military tactical radio transceiver - interoperated with the AN/VRC-12
