= NASAMS =

Norwegian surface-to-air missile system

National (or Norwegian) Advanced Surface-to-Air Missile System
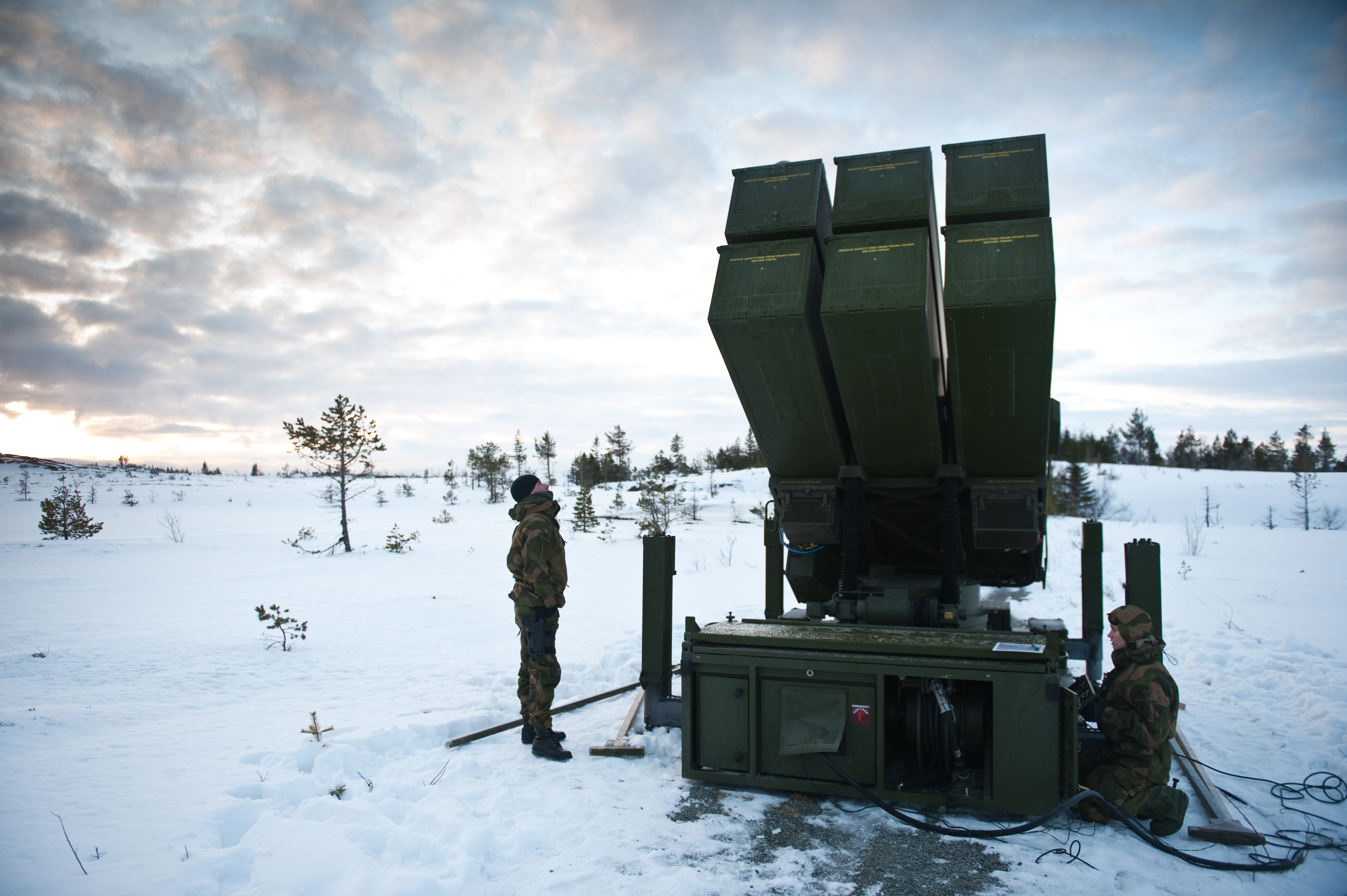
- NASAMS launcher
- Type: Surface-to-air missile system
- Place of origin: Norway / United States

Service history
- In service: 1997–present
- Used by: See operators
- Wars: Russo-Ukrainian War; Russian invasion of Ukraine

Production history
- Designer: Kongsberg Defence & Aerospace
- Manufacturer: Kongsberg Defence & Aerospace and Missiles & Defense
- Developed into: Kongsberg NOMADS (National Manoeuvre Air Defence System)

Specifications
- Crew: 2
- Effective firing range: Missile range: 40 km (NASAMS 2 / AMRAAM) 60 km (NASAMS 3 / AMRAAM-ER); Radar track range: 120 km (NASAMS 2 / MPQ-64F1)
- Flight altitude: 21 km (NASAMS 2) 35.7 km (NASAMS 3 / AMRAAM-ER)

NASAMS (National Advanced Surface-to-Air Missile System, also known as Norwegian Advanced Surface-to-Air Missile System) is a short- to medium-range ground-based air defense system developed by Kongsberg Defence & Aerospace (KDA) and RTX Corporation. The system defends against unmanned aerial vehicles (UAVs), helicopters, cruise missiles, unmanned combat aerial vehicles (UCAVs), and fixed wing aircraft, firing any of a wide range of existing missiles.

NASAMS was the first application of a surface-launched AIM-120 AMRAAM (Advanced Medium Range Air-to-Air Missile). NASAMS 2 is an upgraded version of the system capable of using Link 16, which has been operational since 2007. As of 2022, NASAMS 3 is the latest upgrade. Deployed in 2019, it adds capability to fire AIM-9X Sidewinder and AMRAAM-ER missiles and to integrate with C-RAM and C-UAS systems, and introduces mobile air-liftable launchers. NASAMS has proven interoperability with longer range systems such as Patriot.

== Development ==
Development of NASAMS began in the 1980s when Kongsberg Defence & Aerospace (KDA) teamed up with Hughes Missile Systems and Hughes Aircraft Ground Systems Group and initiated the program as a cooperative effort for the Royal Norwegian Air Force (RNoAF). As originally envisioned, NASAMS would replace two Nike Hercules facilities in defending Norway's southern air bases, where it would act in conjunction with F-16s in providing a layered defense.

The integrated air defense battle management command and control system, based on KS500F computers and the KMC9000 control console with two color CRT displays, was first developed for the Norwegian Adapted Hawk (NOAH) program, an upgrade to the MIM-23B Improved Hawk semi-active radar head, surface-to-air missile system. This command and control system integrated existing AN/MPQ-46 High Power Illuminator Doppler Radar (HPIR) with AN/TPQ-36 counter-battery radar, modified into a three-dimensional low-altitude airspace surveillance radar with the TPQ-36A software upgrade.

The upgraded NOAH would still engage only one target per launcher pad, which was insufficient to counter the emerging threat of massive firing of cruise missiles. RNoAF ordered further development of a distributed, network-centric air defense system with multiple launchers and radars.

The MIM-23B missile was replaced with the active radar homing AIM-120 AMRAAM missile, which also uses an inertial navigation system during initial approach. The TPQ-36A radar was upgraded to the rotating AN/MPQ-64 Sentinel configuration. Test launches were performed in June 1993. The system had an initial operational capability in late 1994 – early 1995. It was fully operationally fielded in 1998.

An enhanced NASAMS 2 was developed in the 2000s and became operational in 2006. A third generation, NASAMS 3, was developed in the 2010s and fielded in 2019.

=== First generation NASAMS ===
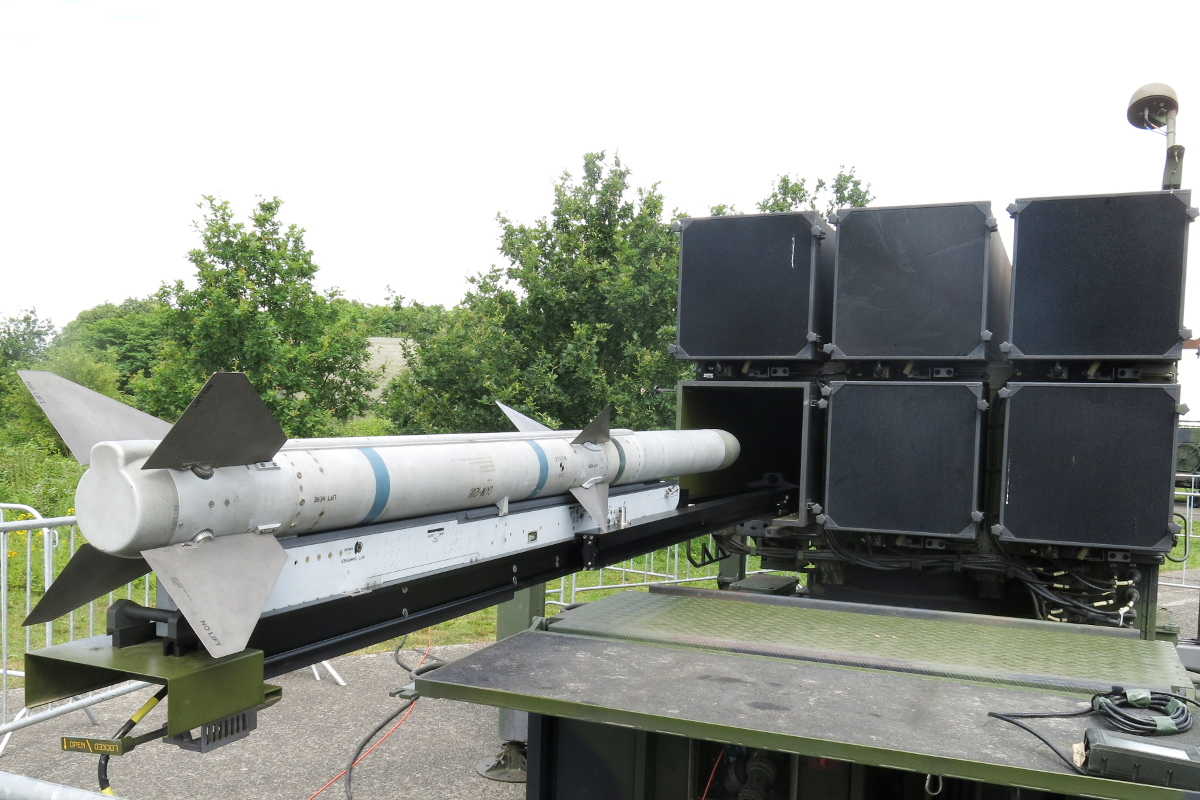
An AIM-120 dummy missile on a rail extending from the canister

The system integrates U.S.-built TPQ-36A air defense X band 3D radar and AMRAAM missiles with a Norwegian developed battle management C4I (command, control, communication, computers and intelligence) system called FDC, short for Fire Distribution Center. The FDC connected to a radar forms an "Acquisition Radar and Control System" (ARCS). NASAMS capabilities are enhanced by the system's networked and distributed nature. The shelter module hosts two identical consoles for the Tactical Control Officer (TCO) and the Tactical Control Assistant (TCA).

The AMRAAM missile is fired from a towed launcher with six missile canisters; the standard AMRAAM missile has a horizontal range of up to 25 kilometers (16 mi). Other sources cite a range of "over 15 km" and 40 km for the extended range version.

By the late 1990s, RNoAF formed an integrated ground-based air defense system known as the Norwegian Solution (NORSOL), by connecting NASAMS battle management ARCS stations with two other air defense systems via field wires and radio. Subordinate weapon systems included the RBS 70 laser beam assisted MANPADS system and the Bofors 40 mm L70 gun, controlled by the Oerlikon Contraves FCS2000 monopulse doppler tracking radar. The solution integrated all three systems (NASAMS, RBS 70, and L70/FCS2000) to provide battlefield awareness to commanders of all echelons, and to ensure protection of friendly aircraft while preventing overkill (i.e. engagement of a single threat by multiple air-defense units) and underkill (failure to engage the threat by any unit).

=== NASAMS 2 ===
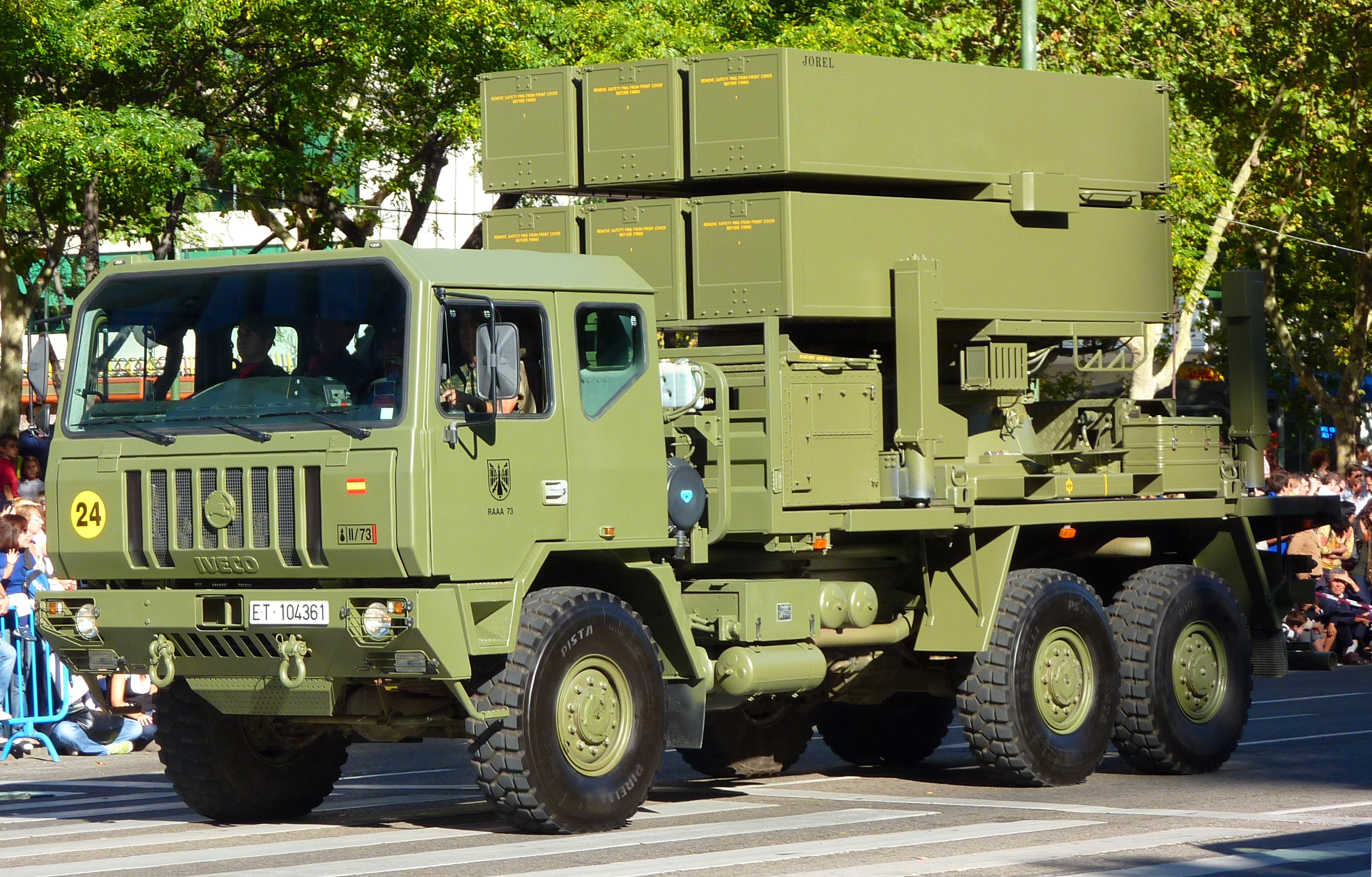
A Spanish NASAMS 2 launcher vehicle during a military parade in 2009

The RNoAF together with KDA conducted a mid-life update of NASAMS in the early 2000s, called NASAMS 2. The upgraded version was handed over to RNoAF in mid-2006. The major difference between the two versions is the use of standard tactical data links (Link 16, Link 11, JREAP, ATDL-1 etc.), as well as a better ground radar. Full operational capability (FOC) was expected for 2007.

A complete NASAMS 2 battery consists of up to four firing units. Each firing unit includes 3 missile launchers (LCHR), each carrying six AIM-120 AMRAAM missiles, one AN/MPQ-64F1 Improved Sentinel radar, one Fire Distribution Center vehicle, and one electro-optical camera vehicle (MSP500).

The Improved Sentinel radar has a broader frequency spectrum, variable rotation speed, and increased capacity to detect and follow targets. The radar platform comes on a trailer with its own power supply that can be towed by a variety of vehicles. Each radar can process and distribute the data independently, and can be connected via radio links, cable, through Multi Rolle Radio, or through TADKOM.

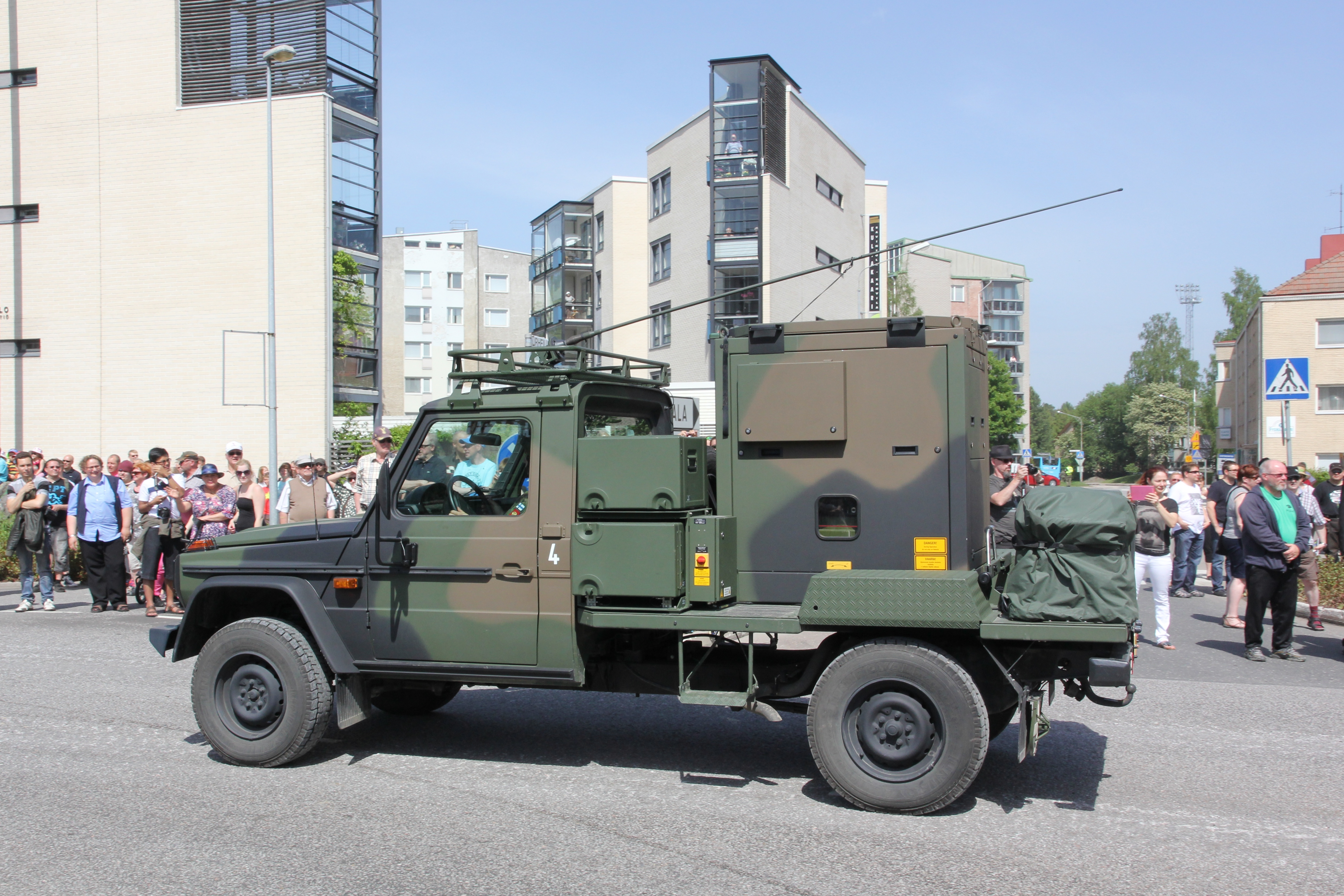
Rheinmetall MSP600 electro-optical sensor

The MSP500 electro-optical sensor from Rheinmetall is equipped with a laser rangefinder and a TV camera, as well as an upgraded thermographic camera. These can be used to fire the missiles passively, which has been successfully tested. MSP600 is a new lightweight version updated with digital signal processing. It is used by several countries.

Fire Distribution Centers (FDCs) can form a network with geographically distributed sensors and use either centralised or distributed data fusion to process radar tracks and form a complete airspace picture for the Tactical Control Officer (TCO). Each command post includes two color displays with a task-based common tactical operation control (CTOC) interface. The control system can detach itself from the sensors in order to become less visible.

Operators can switch to a centralized control role by running operation center software (GBADOC). An optional Tactical Control Center (TCC) vehicle, similar to the Battalion Operations Center (BOC) for the Hawk XXI upgrade, includes a third command post which can be used for this role.

The control modules can be mounted on a large variety of vehicles. Each module can automatically determine its position using electronic northfinder and GPS receiver.

=== NASAMS 3 ===
In April 2019, RNoAF fielded the upgraded NASAMS 3 system. In May 2019, the first live firing tests were conducted.

NASAMS 3 comes with an updated Fire Distribution Center station, an "ADX" console that has ergonomic control surfaces and three 30" flat-panel displays. The redesigned Mk 2 canister launcher can fire AIM-9X Sidewinder Block II short-range missiles and AMRAAM-ER missiles from its launching rails, in addition to AIM-120 AMRAAM. AMRAAM-ER is an extended range upgrade, based upon an Evolved Sea Sparrow Missile rocket motor, paired with a two-stage AMRAAM guidance head, expanding its engagement envelope, with a 50 percent increase in maximum range and 70 percent increase in maximum altitude, giving a maximum range of about 50 km. The extended range missile will have greater ability to take down fast flying and hard-maneuvering targets. In May 2019, the AIM-9X Block II was test fired from NASAMS launchers at the Andøya Space Center in Norway.

A new short-range 'Mobile Ground Based Air Defense System' configuration had been developed for initial deployment with Brigade Nord of the Norwegian Army. Each battery includes six mobile IRIS-T SLS missile launchers mounted on tracked vehicles and three M1152A1 HMMWV-based High Mobility Launcher (HML) for the AIM-120 AMRAAM, which were originally developed for the U.S. Army SLAMRAAM project. They can be air-lifted by C-130 Hercules or C-17 Globemaster.

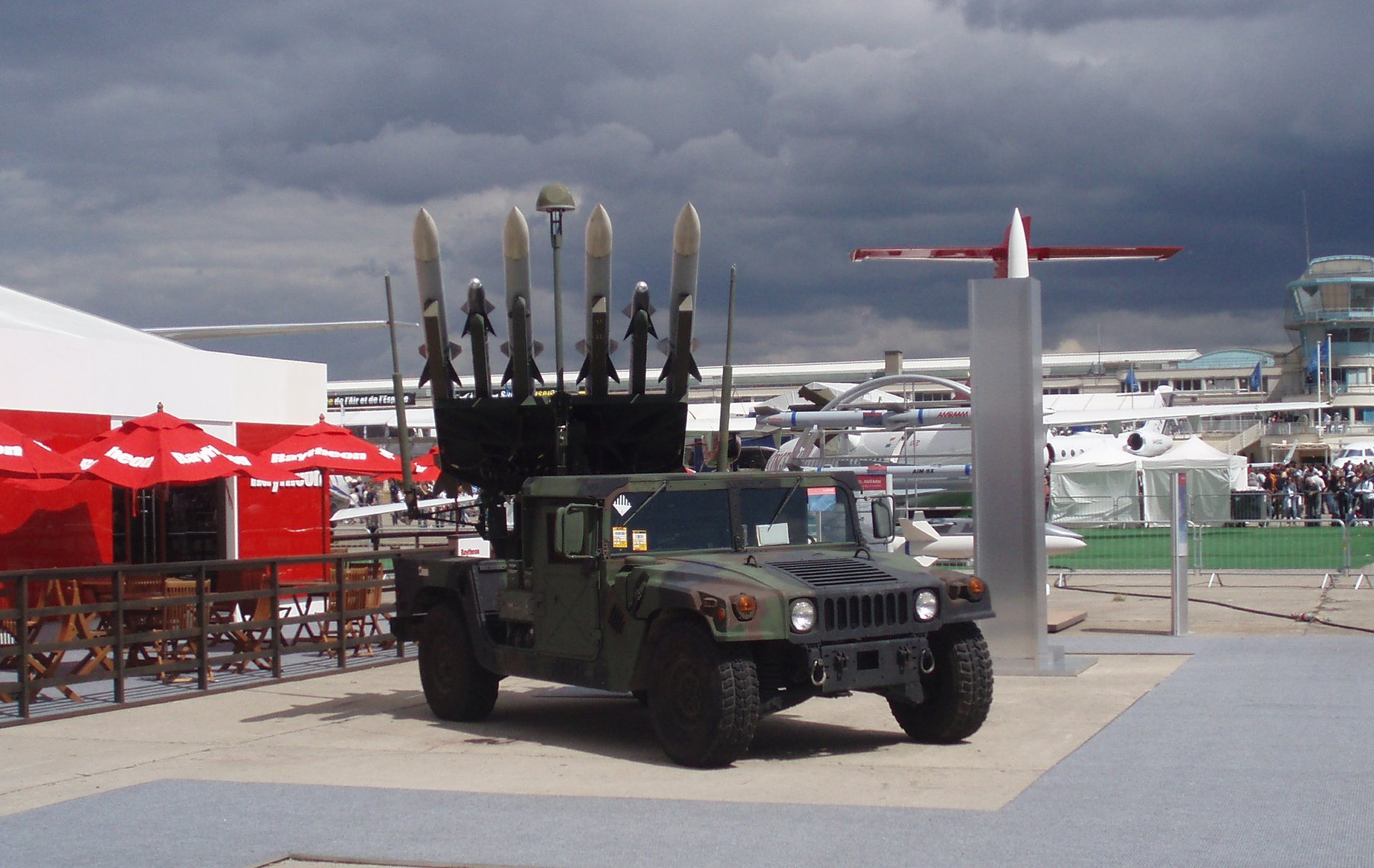
A High Mobility Launcher (HML) with four AIM-120 AMRAAM and two AIM-9X Sidewinder missiles

The High Mobility Launcher is capable of launching both AIM-120 and AIM-9X from its four launching rails, and can be equipped with two additional rails. IRIS-T launchers and support vehicles will be based on the Armoured Combat Support Vehicle (ACSV) and upgraded M113 (M577A2) command vehicles. They will be equipped with XENTA-M X-band radars designed by Weibel Scientific.

In June 2019, Australia ordered a locally made version of NASAMS 3, with CEA tactical (CEATAC) and towed CEA operational (CEAOPS) AESA radars, High Mobility Launchers and radar carried on Hawkei PMV vehicles instead of HMMWV, and Fire Distribution Center shelters produced at the Raytheon Australia's facility at Mawson Lakes. The system includes Raytheon AN/AAS-52 Multispectral Targeting System (MTS)-A, an electro-optical/infrared (EO/IR) guidance system with a high resolution day/night imaging sensor, and integrated laser rangefinder. The ADF plans to spend A$2.5 billion on its NASAMS-based air-defence network.

In October 2021, Raytheon announced that the NASAMS 3 will be upgraded with GhostEye MR, a new medium-range S-band AESA radar based on GhostEye (formerly LTAMDS) technology developed for the MIM-104 Patriot system. In March 2022, Raytheon demonstrated that the High Energy Laser Weapon System (HELWS) can be paired with NASAMS to destroy a swarm of drone targets.

== Missiles ==
The AMRAAM is one of the most widely used air-to-air missiles in the world, and stockpiles of it are higher than any other comparable system. As NASAMS uses existing air-to-air missiles such as the AIM-9 Sidewinder, AMRAAM, and AMRAAM-ER, there may be thousands of older missiles in NATO's arsenal that can be fired from a NASAMS battery without change. The AIM-9X variant includes an internal cooling system, eliminating the need for launch-rail nitrogen supply required by older variants of the missile.

A report has described NASAMS as "extremely well suited to Ukraine because of the massive numbers of missiles that NATO and allies can supply, specifically for the air defence system." In particular, older AMRAAM A and B models have been replaced, making available many older missiles which could be sent to Ukraine. For example the UK government has offered to donate "[h]undreds of additional air defence missiles" including the AMRAAMs.

IRIS-T missile integration is also in progress according to Boris Pastorius, the minister of defence of Germany.

== Service history ==
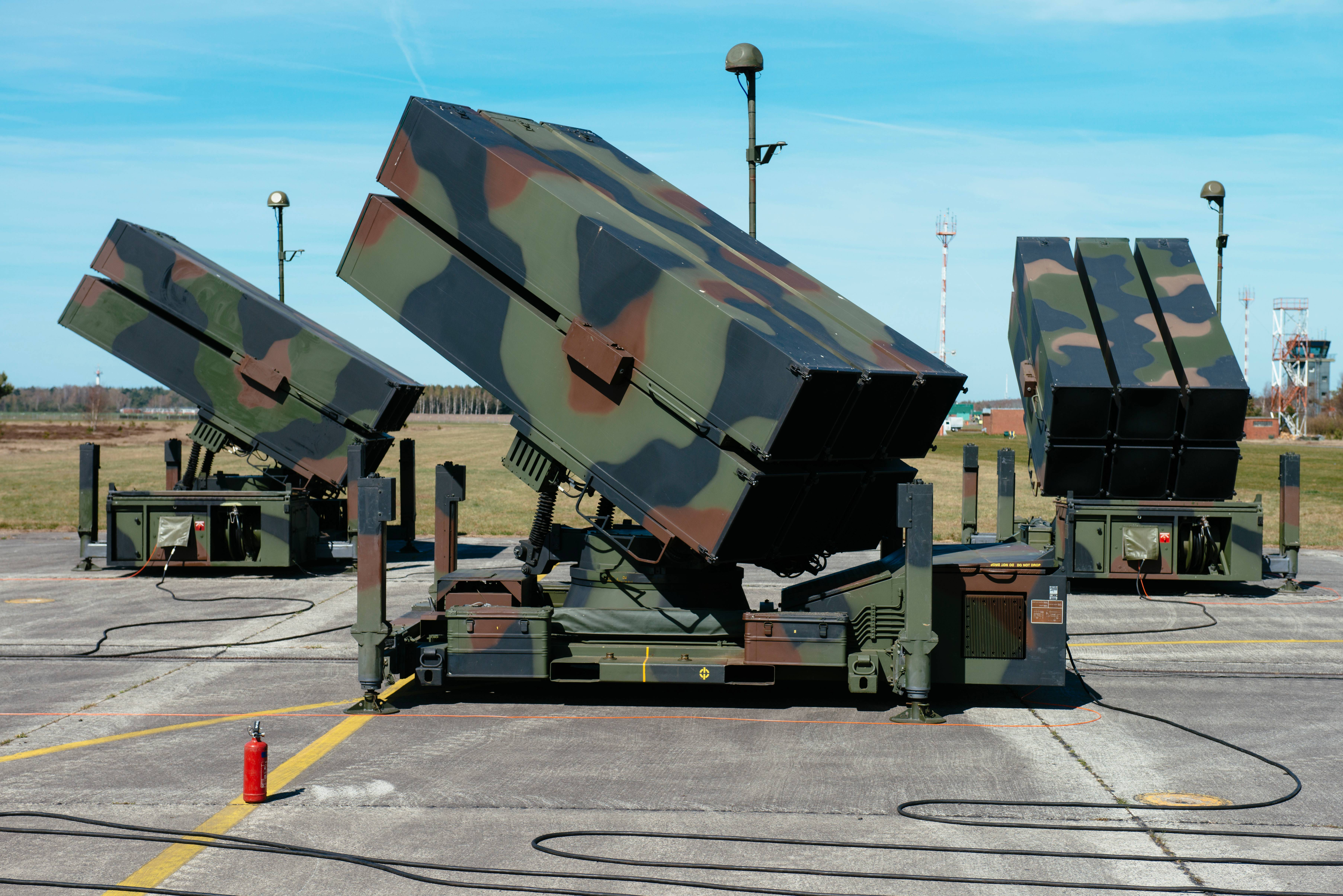
NASAMS launchers in Dutch service

In the U.S., several NASAMS were used to guard air space over Washington, D.C. during the 2005 United States presidential inauguration, and are used to protect air space around the White House, such as at nearby Fort Belvoir and the Carderock NSWC.

In 2017, Lithuania ordered the NASAMS-3 to improve its own air defense capabilities; two batteries were delivered in 2020.

In April 2017, Australia approved a single-supplier-limited Request for Tender (RFT) to Raytheon Australia to develop NASAMS for the ADF short-range ground-based air-defence system. In June 2019, Kongsberg Defence & Aerospace AS (Norway) was awarded a US$185 million contract by Raytheon Australia for delivery of NASAMS components, while Raytheon Australia is the prime contractor to deliver NASAMS to the Australian Government Land 19 Phase 7B program. The Australian version of NASAMS GBAD will use locally made components. Defence minister Marise Payne announced first-pass approval in April 2017. In September 2021, the first two Fire Distribution Centres for the Australian NASAMS passed factory acceptance tests. In February 2022, the Mk2 canister for NASAMS launchers had been completed. It was planned to deliver three canister launchers in 2022.

In 2019, Qatar placed an order for AMRAAM-ER missiles as part of a NASAMS purchase.

=== Ukrainian service ===
On 1 July 2022, the United States through the Pentagon announced, as part of an $820 million military aid package to Ukraine, the delivery of NASAMS air defense systems through the Ukraine Security Assistance Initiative (USAI) during the Russian invasion of Ukraine. A US defence official said the existing Ukrainian air defense systems are Soviet-type systems, so over time it will be harder to sustain them. This is part of updating Ukrainian air defence from a Soviet-era system to a modern one. The systems being supplied may come from Norwegian stocks and may be retired units. Norway's minister of defence confirmed, "Norway has previously contributed equipment and training to US donations of NASAMS to Ukraine. These donations have been highly valued and contributed to defeat missile attacks", which confirms the rumors of Norway's part in the donations.

On 29 July 2022, the US DoD disclosed that it had started the formal process of acquiring two NASAMS batteries of six launchers each for Ukraine. On 24 August 2022, the US DoD announced that it would provide six additional NASAMS units "with additional munitions" to Ukraine under the USAI. The Pentagon said in late September 2022 that the NASAMS would start to be delivered in "two months or so".

The initial NASAMS batteries for Ukraine arrived in early November 2022. The Pentagon stated that NASAMS had a 100% success rate during the Russian missile strikes on 15 November 2022. Ukrainian President Zelenskyy disclosed that the system shot down 10 missiles out of 10 targeted. The US government has been trying to obtain more NASAMS from Middle Eastern countries, as manufacturing a new system from scratch with current production rates may take two years. According to Raytheon CEO Gregory J. Hayes, the systems obtained from the Middle Eastern countries would later be replaced by the new ones. However, Hayes denied that these Middle Eastern countries would have to wait 2 years to obtain new NASAMS: "Just because it takes 24 months to build, it doesn't mean it's going to take 24 months to get in [the] country."

In March 2023, Norway announced the donation of two complete NASAMS firing units to Ukraine, in collaboration with the United States. This decision was part of the Nansen Programme, under which Norway allocates NOK 15 billion annually from 2023 to 2027, with half of the 2023 funds designated for military assistance. The contribution aimed to bolster Ukraine's defense against missile attacks amid ongoing conflicts. These two NASAMS systems are in addition to the two units provided by the United States in the fall of 2022.

In April 2023, the Ukrainian Air Force said that NASAMS have destroyed more than 100 enemy missiles and drones.

In December 2023, Norway announced the donation of additional NASAMS air defense systems to Ukraine, valued at NOK 335 million. To expedite delivery, some systems will be provided from Norway's existing stockpiles, while others will be procured from the defense industry for future transfer. In addition to this package, the Ministry of Defence decided to order eight NASAMS launchers and four fire direction centers to Ukraine directly from Kongsberg Defence & Aerospace valued at NOK 12,5 billion. This will match the quantity of Norway's previous contributions of NASAMS systems. Norway's total contribution to Ukraine's air defense to 16 launchers and eight fire direction centers, with the exact contents from the latest NOK 335 million donation unspecified.

On February 26, 2024, the first Ukrainian NASAMS launcher was destroyed by Russian forces in Zaporizhzhia. As of 27 March 2024, at least 2 NASAMS launchers were destroyed by Russian forces.

On 27 February 2024, Raytheon successfully test fired an AMRAAM-ER from a NASAMS for the first time.

On 28 February 2024, the Kyiv Post claimed that the Ukrainian Air Force had downed 10 Russian warplanes in just ten days including Sukhoi Su-34, Sukhoi Su-35 and one Beriev A-50.

In December 2024, Norway announced the deployment of NASAMS air defense systems to Poland to safeguard the airspace above Rzeszów Airport, a vital logistics hub for coordinating military aid to Ukraine. The NASAMS air defence systems and Norwegian F-35 fighter jets will support this mission, which is set to commence in early December 2024 and continue until Easter 2025. This deployment underscores NASAMS' role in international defense collaborations and its operational significance within NATO frameworks. "Russia's invasion of Ukraine has demonstrated the value of air defence, and the Norwegian contribution in Poland is highly appreciated. We are doing this primarily for Ukraine and Poland, but it also shows that we stand by our commitments within NATO", says Defence Minister Gram.

In February 2025, the Norwegian Armed Forces announced that NASAMS had shot down 900 missiles and drones over Ukraine, with a hit rate of 94%. Of the approximately 900 air threats that NASAMS has neutralized since November 2022, almost 60% were cruise missiles, such as the Kh-101, Kh-555, Kalibr, Iskander-K, Kh-59, and Kh-69.

On 27 April 2025, the Ukrainian Air Force reported that NASAMS, operated by a unit led by Kyrylo Peretiatko, intercepted 11 Russian cruise missiles in an operation lasting under two minutes. The unit has destroyed over 150 aerial targets to date, primarily cruise missiles. The NASAMS system detected and engaged the targets with rapid launches, noted for its record-setting reloading and efficiency, according to Peretiatko.

On November 2026 it was announced that the NASAMS battery operated by Ukraine's 96th Anti-aircraft Missile Brigade had destroyed over 300 Russian targets since becoming operational.

== Operators ==
NASAMS-1 operators NASAMS-2 operators NASAMS-3 operators Awaiting delivery

NASAMS has been exported to the United States, with the NASAMS 2 upgrade having been exported to Finland, the Netherlands, Spain, Oman, and Chile.

There were 13 official operators as of September 2022. Kongsberg stated that NASAMS was in operational use in Norway, Spain, the United States, the Netherlands, Finland, Oman, Lithuania, Indonesia and "one undisclosed customer". The system is in production for Australia, Qatar, Hungary, and Ukraine. The NASAMS is in use with both armies and air forces around the world in addition to Poland, Greece, and Turkey operate the Kongsberg Command and Control solution for various weapon systems.

=== Current operators ===
Australia (6 NASAMS-3 fire units)
Contract for NASAMS-3 signed in March 2017, valued at A$2.5 billion. The system will be locally-assembled by Raytheon Australia and will replace RBS-70 systems in service. Australia received its first launchers in 2022.
The contract consists of 2 batteries with 3 fire units each.
Chile (NASAMS-2)
Ordered in 2011.
Denmark (2)
The Danish ministry of Defence leased one fire unit from Kongsberg, for deployment late 2025 until the two ordered newly produced fire units will be delivered. The contract for their purchase was signed in November 2025. On 17 December 2025, the leased NASAMS system became operational at the Royal Danish Air Force's Skalstrup Air Base.
Finland (8 NASAMS-2 fire units)
Finland selected the NASAMS-2 in 2009. Each of the 8 fire units consist of 3 launchers, a FDC by Kongsberg (Fire Distribution Centre) and a 3D targeting radar AN/MPQ-64F1 Improved Sentinel. The launchers are transported by the Sisu E13TP 8×8 and the MPC is based on a Sisu A2045 4×4.
Additionally the battery has an electro-optical sensor vehicle, called MSP-600, which has a 3D-tracking Saphir-heat camera, ELEM laser distance measuring instrument that can measure up to 40 km, a Nedinsco camera for daytime use (10x magnification) and a GPS positioning device. It is built onto a Mercedes-Benz G-series utility vehicle. Built by Finnish Defence Power Systems.
Hungary (7 NASAMS-3 fire units)
7 fire units ordered in 2020 for a value of €410 million. On top of that, Hungary is to receive 180 AMRAAM missiles and 60 AMRAAM-ER (C7-C8). The estimate of the missiles cost if of US$730 million.
The first delivery of 2 fire units took place in November 2023, with the rest that was expected in 2024.
Indonesia (2 NASAMS-2 fire units)
Two NASAMS-2 fire units delivered and in service as of 2020.
Lithuania (at least 3 NASAMS-3 fire units)
Two NASAMS-3 batteries delivered in 2020, each with four launchers, as a part of a $128 million deal. More systems for €200m and €234m were ordered in December 2023 and October 2024 respectively. Lithuania is known to have three systems, but the number of fire units and launchers is not disclosed.
Netherlands (2 NASAMS-2 fire units in service, 6 NASAMS-3 fire units on order)
Two fire units of the NASAMS-2 were ordered in 2006, each consisting of 1 fire-control center, 1 AN/MPQ-64M2 targeting radar, 3 launchers and a Hensoldt TRML-3D/32 search radar.
Six NASAMS-3 fire units were ordered in October 2024, as part of the Dutch CITADEL air defence initiative. The new NASAMS 3 will be organised in 6 firing units consisting of 3 launchers, 1 Thales Ground Master 200 Multi Mission radar and 1 fire control vehicle. On 21 November 2024 it was announced that a contract was signed for the delivery of the NASAMS-3 and NOMADS systems with AMRAAM-ER missiles.
Norway
NASAMS-2 and NASAMS-3. In May 2023 the Norwegian Government published FAF (Future acquisitions to the defence sector 2023-2030) which states the investment budget of 43 billion NOK to strengthen the ground-based air defence systems, focusing heavily on the existing NASAMS system. Including replacing the old MSAM missiles with new AIM-120C-8 AMRAAM missiles for the NASAMS launch systems. Two batteries and two simulators were ordered in December 2024.
Oman (NASAMS-2)
Contract signed with Raytheon in January 2014 for the NASAMS-2, valued at US$1.28 billion.
Qatar
The NASAMS fire units were ordered in 2019, making Qatar the 11th client. Qatar is the first country to procure AMRAAM-ER, the surface-to-air extended-range variant. A modification of the contract with Raytheon was made in 2020, and the total value of the contract amounted to US$346.5 million. It was used among others to protect the 2022 FIFA World Cup.
The fire units are based on the UNIMOG platform.
Spain (4 NASAMS-2 fire units)
Four fire units NASAMS-2 acquired in 2003.
In 2025, a contract was signed to modernise the systems to the standard NASAMS-2+.
Ukraine (13 NASAMS fire units, 6 additional launchers, 2 additional command and control systems)
Ukraine has a total of 13 NASAMS systems with an additional two launchers donated by Lithuania and 4 by Norway (with 2 additional command and control systems). It has received 12 systems from the United States and another from Canada at the end of 2024. It has also received four launchers and 2 command and control systems from Norway.
United States
Used with AN/TWQ-1 Avenger for additional protection to high-value targets and Washington, D.C.

=== Future operators ===
Belgium (9)
9 NASAMS-3 fire units ordered in July 2026.
Kuwait
Requested to buy 63 AIM-120C-8 Advanced Medium Range Air-to-Air Missiles (AMRAAM); 63 AIM-9X Sidewinder Block II tactical missiles; 12 Multifunctional Information Distribution Systems – Low Volume Terminal (MIDS LVT) Block Upgrade 2; and 12 MIDS LVT Cryptographic Modules. Approved by U.S. Department of State as a Foreign Military Sale in October 2022.
Luxembourg (1)
1 NASAMS-3 system via joint purchase contract with Belgium.
Taiwan (3)
The U.S. government agreed to let Taiwan buy NASAMS air defense missile systems, during the annual Monterey Talks security meeting between both sides in Annapolis in June 2022. Taiwan will be allowed to buy the latest variant of NASAMS, which can fire AIM-9X, AMRAAM, and AMRAAM-ER missiles. Taiwan decided to purchase "more than four Company" NASAMS systems, following the U.S. government's approval. The purchase will not be carried out until 2024, due to the demand on production capabilities for Ukraine. October 25, 2024, the United States government agreed to sell 3 NASAMS system and 123 AMRAAM-ER missiles to Taiwan. The U.S will deliver the first batch of NASAMS air defense system to the armed forces of Taiwan by late 2025.

=== Potential operators ===
Egypt (4)
Approval of the sale of the NASAMS from the US State department in July 2025 at the cost of $4.67 billion.

=== Failed bids ===
India
India considered purchasing NASAMS in 2018, but ultimately decided against it because of the high costs of around $2 billion USD per system, which prompted negotiations between the US and India to break down. The Indian Air Force favored funding the Integrated Air Defense Weapon System and the Indian Ballistic Missile Defence Program while also continuing future procurement of the S-400 and Barak-8 systems.
Estonia and Latvia
In 2022, Latvia and Estonia signed a letter of intent on a joint purchase of medium-range air defense systems. NASAMS was considered as a likely candidate. In May 2023, the Latvian and Estonian governments announced the decision to jointly procure the IRIS-T SLM systems.
Romania
€3.85 billion was allocated for 41 launchers, to be purchased in 2 phases. It was in competition against the NASAMS from Kongsberg, the VL Mica from MBDA France, the SPYDER from Rafael and the KM-SAM from Hanwha. It was to replace the S-75M3 and the MIM-23 Hawk (Phase IIIR) air defence systems. For the SHORAD part, the SPYDER was selected in July 2025. The offer will also include the Iron Dome system.
Slovakia
The Ministry of Defence of the Slovak republic was negotiating with Kongsberg Defence and Raytheon about the procurement of NASAMS on June 20, 2024 while negotiating with other companies about the potential procurement of different systems. The biggest competitors of the NASAMS were the SAMP/T from EuroSAM and the Barak MX from Israel Aerospace Industries. Eventually, Slovakia decided to order six Barak MX batteries, and these are replacing old Soviet 2K12 Kub medium-range systems.
Switzerland
Bid for Bodluv MR Programme launched in April 2024. Armasuisse requested an offer to Kongsberg / Raytheon for a medium range air defence system (NASAMS or MGBAD), MBDA is in competition against Diehl (with a variant of the IRIS-T SL) and MBDA (with the CAMM, CAMM-ER or MICA-VL). Tender was launched 30 April 2024, offer to be provided by July 2024, decision expected in the third quarter 2024 and the financing and order is planned with the armament program 2025. Note: "ESSI participation doesn't preclude the system choice." In July 2024, Kongsberg / Raytheon and MBDA made the decision to not submit an offer for the Bodluv MR Programme. Diehl therefore won the tender with the IRIS-T SLM. Armasuisse will now enter in negotiation for the purchase of the system.

== See also ==
- CAMM – (United Kingdom, Italy)
- HİSAR – (Turkey)
- KM-SAM – (South Korea)
- Multi-Mission Launcher – (United States)
- QRSAM – (India)
- Sky Dragon 50 – (China)
- SPYDER – (Israel)
- Type 03 Chū-SAM – (Japan)
- VL MICA – (France)
- VL-SRSAM – (India)
