= AN/PRC-77 Portable Transceiver =

Military tactical radio transceiver

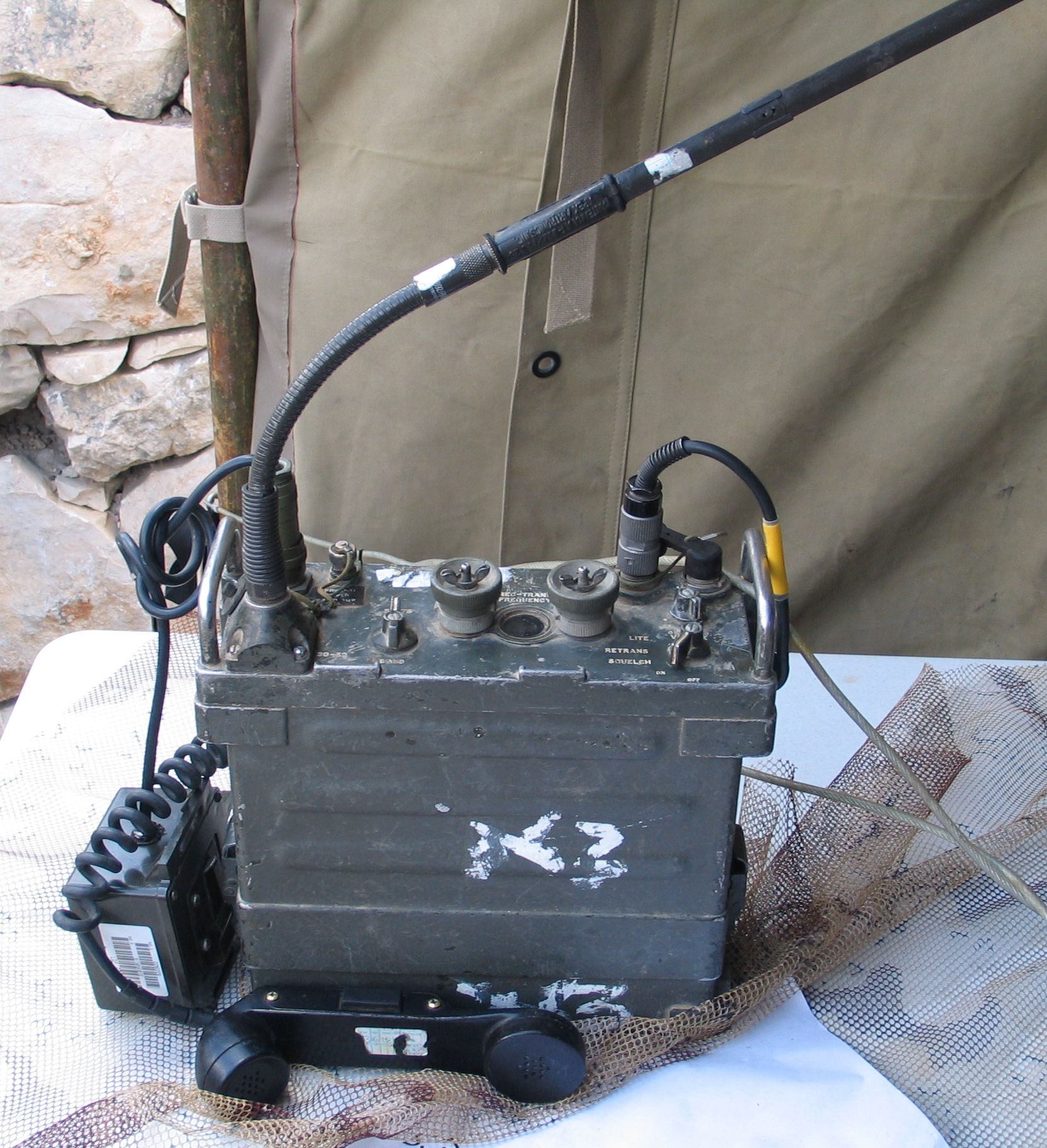
AN/PRC 77 radio and handset

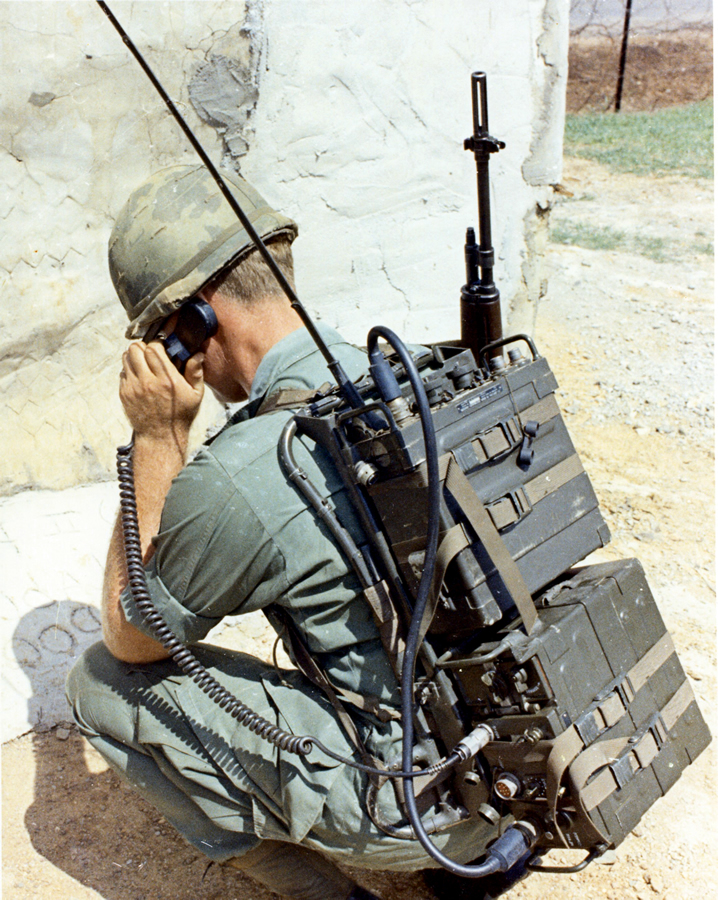
American soldier using the KY-38 "man-pack", part of the NESTOR voice encryption system that was used during the Vietnam War. The upper unit is an AN/PRC-77 radio transceiver. The combined weight of the units, 54 pounds (24.5 kg), proved an obstacle to their use in combat.

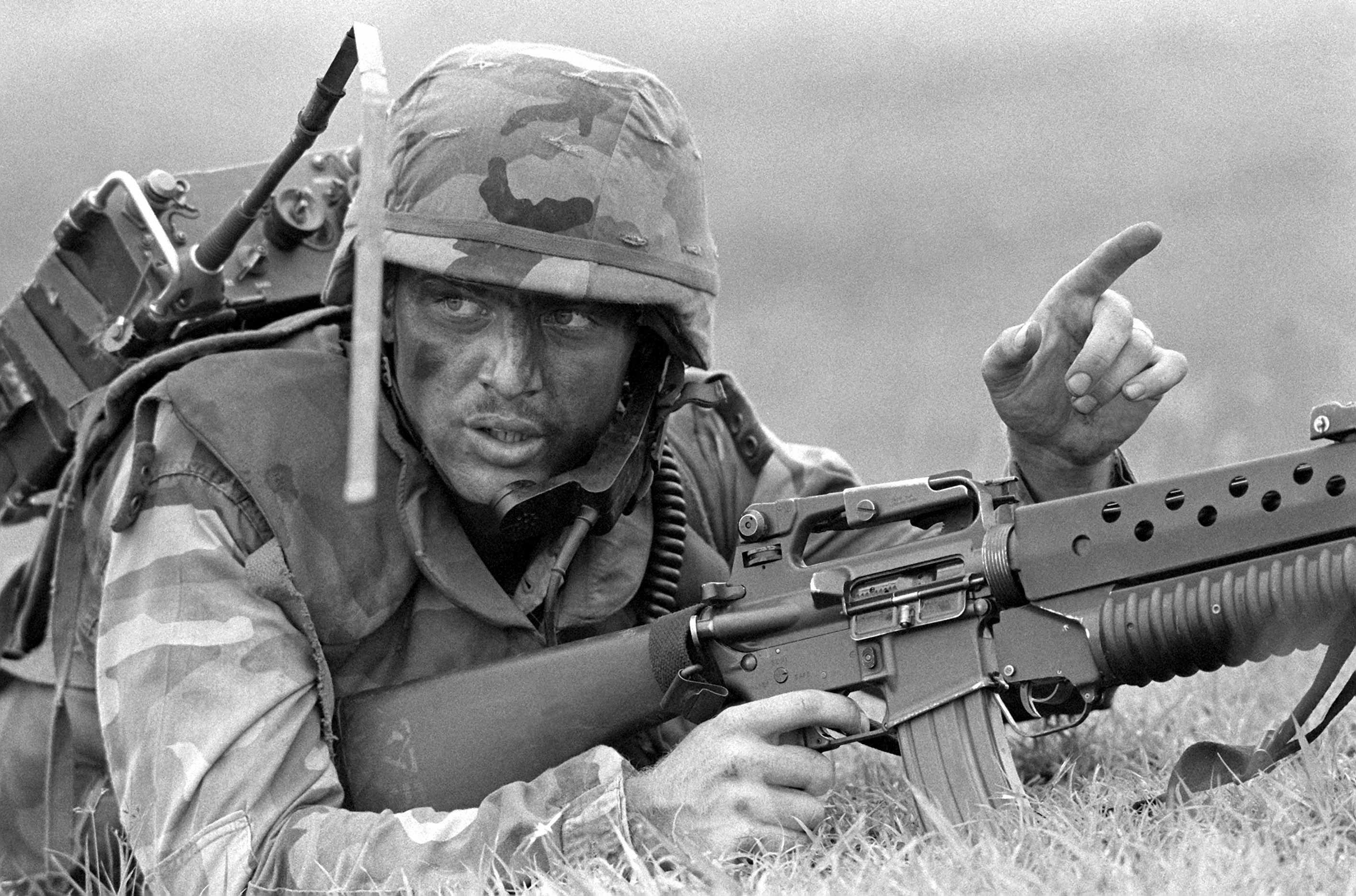
U.S. Marine carrying a PRC-77 during a training exercise in 1989

The AN/PRC-77 Portable Transceiver, also known as AN/PRC 77 Radio Set, is a man-pack, portable VHF FM combat-net radio transceiver manufactured by Associated Industries and used to provide short-range, two-way radiotelephone voice communication.

In accordance with the Joint Electronics Type Designation System (JETDS), the "AN/PRC-77" designation represents the 77th design of an Army-Navy electronic device for portable two-way communications radio. The JETDS system also now is used to name all Department of Defense electronic systems.

== History ==
The AN/PRC-77 entered service in 1968 during the Vietnam War as an upgrade to the earlier AN/PRC-25. It differs from its predecessor mainly in that the PRC-77's final power amplifier stage is made with a transistor, eliminating the only vacuum tube in the PRC-25, as well as the DC-DC voltage converter used to create the high plate voltage for the tube from the 15 V battery. In addition, the PRC-25 could not support voice encryption devices, but PRC-77 transmitter audio bandwidth was widened to give it the ability to use the TSEC/KY-38 NESTOR voice encryption system used in Vietnam, and the later KY-57 VINSON family. The transmitter's spurious emissions were cleaned up to create less interference to nearby receivers. The receiver's performance was also hardened in the PRC-77 to enable it to better reject interference suffered from nearby transmitters, a common operating set up that reduced the effectiveness of the PRC-25. The receiver audio bandwidth was also increased to operate with the encryption equipment.

There were no changes to the external controls or looks, so the two radios looked and the operating controls were the same. The equipment tag glued to the edge of the front panel was the main (external) way to tell the difference. The original batteries had a 3 V tap (series diode-reduced to 2.4 V) for the PRC-25's tube filament. This remained unchanged so the batteries could operate either radio it was placed in, but the PRC-77 did not use the 3 V tap at all. With the more efficient all-transistorized circuitry, and without the DC-DC step-up voltage converter for the tube, the common battery lasted longer in the PRC-77 under the same conditions. "OF THE TWENTY-FIVE (25) ELECTRONIC MODULES ORIGINALLY USED IN BOTH THE TRANSMITTER AND RECEIVER PORTIONS OF THE AN/PRC-25, ONLY EIGHT (8) OF THE MODULES USED IN THE AN/PRC-77 ARE INTERCHANGEABLE WITH THE AN/PRC-25.'"

Today the AN/PRC-77 has largely been replaced by SINCGARS radios, but it is still capable of inter-operating with most VHF FM radios used by U.S. and allied ground forces. It was commonly nicknamed the "prick-77" by U.S. military forces.

== Technical details ==
The AN/PRC 77 consists of the RT-841 transceiver and minor components. It can provide secure voice (X-mode) transmission with the TSEC/KY-57 VINSON voice encryption device, but is not compatible with the SINCGARS frequency hopping mode. During the Vietnam War, the PRC-77 used the earlier TSEC/KY-38 NESTOR voice encryption system.

Major components:

- Transmitter/Receiver unit
- Battery

Minor components - CES (Complete Equipment Schedule):

- 3 ft antenna - 'bush/battle whip'
- 10 ft antenna
- 3 ft antenna base - 'gooseneck'
- 10 ft antenna base
- Handset
- Harness

Technical characteristics
Channels:	920 channels across two bands using 50 kHz steps
Frequency Ranges:	30.00 to 52.95 MHz (Low Channel); 53.00 to 75.95 MHz (High Channel)
Estimated Range:	8 km (5 mi) Dependent on conditions
Power Output:	1.5 to 2.0 watts
Power Source:	Current (2015) military batteries: BA-5598/U LiSO_{2} nonrechargeable BB-386/U NiMH and BB-2598/U Li-ion rechargeable Obsolete (unavailable) nonrechargeable military batteries: BA-386/PRC-25 zinc-carbon, BA-398/PRC-25 zinc-carbon cold weather vest (use w/cable to radio battery connector), BA-4386/PRC-25 magnesium Discontinued but available military or equivalent batteries: BA-3386/U alkaline nonrechargeable BB-586/U NiCad and BB-LA6 SLA rechargeable
Antenna:	AT-271A/PRC 10 ft (3.0 m) multi-section whip "Static" Whip-a-way, or AT-892/PRL-24 3 ft semi-rigid steel tape "Bush-whip",
Type of Service:	30K0F3E emission (FM); Manpack field radio land mobile service
Weight:	13.75 lb (6.2 kg)
Security	Could be used with TSEC/KY-38 NESTOR and, later, the KY-57 VINSON secure voice systems.
Note:	A modified version of the AN/PRC-77 is available and is designated AN/PRC-1177. This version has been enhanced to allow a smaller channel step of 25 kHz and to reduce voice bandwidth to 6 kHz. These features combine to double the number of available channels to 1840.

== Users ==
Control Panel of a PRC-77

- Austria: The Austrian Army still uses the AN/PRC-77, though in a limited capacity such as training cadets in radio communications. For border patrol the Austrian Army now uses a new device called "TFF-41" (Pentacom RT-405), which is capable of frequency-hopping and digital encryption. The Austrian Army also uses the AN/PRC-1177 for example the Austrian AN/PRC-77 have a special switch for a 25 kHz mode, which reduces the bandwidth of the selected channel by 25 kHz and therefore doubles the number of available channels.
- Bangladesh: The Bangladesh Army use the AN/PRC-77 as a section level communication equipment. In Chittagong Hill Tracts area it is still used for operations. Some modified/improvised local antenna concepts often increase the communication range up to 15–20 km. Now being phased out by far superior Q-MAC's VHF-90M
- Brazil: In Brazil it is used by Brazilian Army It was nicknamed EB-11 RY-20/ERC-110 manufactured by Associated Industries U.S.A and manufactured by AEG Telefunken do Brasil S/A, São Paulo 1970 the radio is used today but is now being replaced but still the PRC-77 remains stored in military units also used for training of technicians in military communications sergeants communications.
- El Salvador: Salvadoran military and security forces used both American and Israeli-manufactured versions during the civil war.
- Finland: The Finnish army uses this radio as a "battalion radio", using it as a common training device. The radio is designated LV 217 'Ventti-seiska' ('ventti' is Finnish slang for '21', from the Finnish variant of blackjack), slowly being phased out of reservist service. FDF also operates PRC-1077 under the designation LV 217M.
- Israel: The Israel Defense Forces used this radio extensively from the early 1970s to the late 1990s, when it was gradually replaced by modern digital devices. However, it can still be found in some units, mostly in stationary temporary posts.
- New Zealand: The New Zealand Defence Force used the '77 set' as its VHF combat arms communications equipment, both manpack and vehicle-mounted Land Rover 'fitted for radio' (FFR) variants, from the late 1960s until the 1990s. It came into New Zealand service with a lot of other US equipment during New Zealand's contribution to the Vietnam War, replacing the New Zealand-built ZC-1 and British equipment dating back to the Second World War.
- Norway: The AN/PRC-77 has been replaced as a main source of radio communication for regular forces of the Norwegian Army by indigenously developed radio sets called MRR (Multi Role Radio) and LFR (Lett Flerbruks Radio) (Norwegian for Light Multi Role Radio), and other modern radios. However the Norwegian Army did not throw these radio sets away. Instead many of them were handed over to the Home Guard which still uses it as their backup radio as there is a limited supply of MRR sets for the force totalling 40 000 soldiers.
- Pakistan: The Pakistani Army has used the set for the past 25+ years. Purchased from different sources including the US, Brazil and Spain, it is scheduled to be replaced in the next 5 years.
- Peru: Used alongside the French TRC 372.
- Philippines: The Philippine Army made extensive use of the AN/PRC-77 for several decades until they were phased out of service with the introduction of newer manpack radios such as the Harris Falcon II during the 2000s.
- Singapore: The Singapore Armed Forces formerly used the AN/PRC-77 up to around the 1990s.
- Spain: The Spanish Army, Spanish Navy (Armada Española), Spanish Marines and Spanish Air Force formerly used the AN/PRC-77. It was replaced by the French PR4G since 2002
- Sweden: In the Swedish Army the radio system goes under the name Radio 145 and Radio 146 (Ra145/146), predominately the Homeguard (National Guard) is issued the Ra145/146.
- Swiss: The Swiss Army used the radio as SE-227.
- Taiwan: The Taiwanese army nicknamed the radio as "77", and had used it for over 40 years when AN/PRC-77, along with AN/VRC-12, were replaced by indigenous radio systems in 2010s.
- Thailand: Still found in some units within the Royal Thai Army

== Photo gallery ==
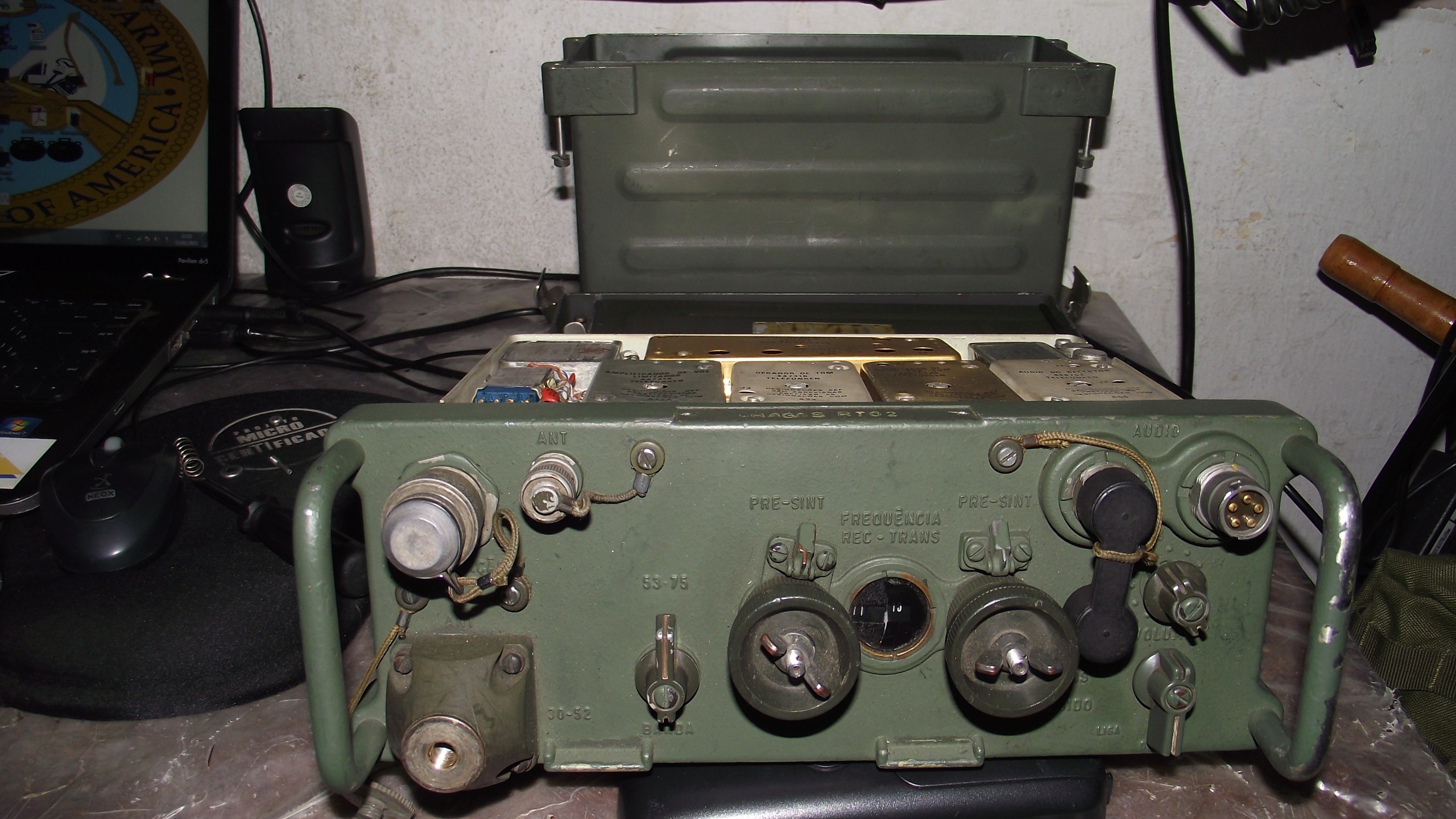

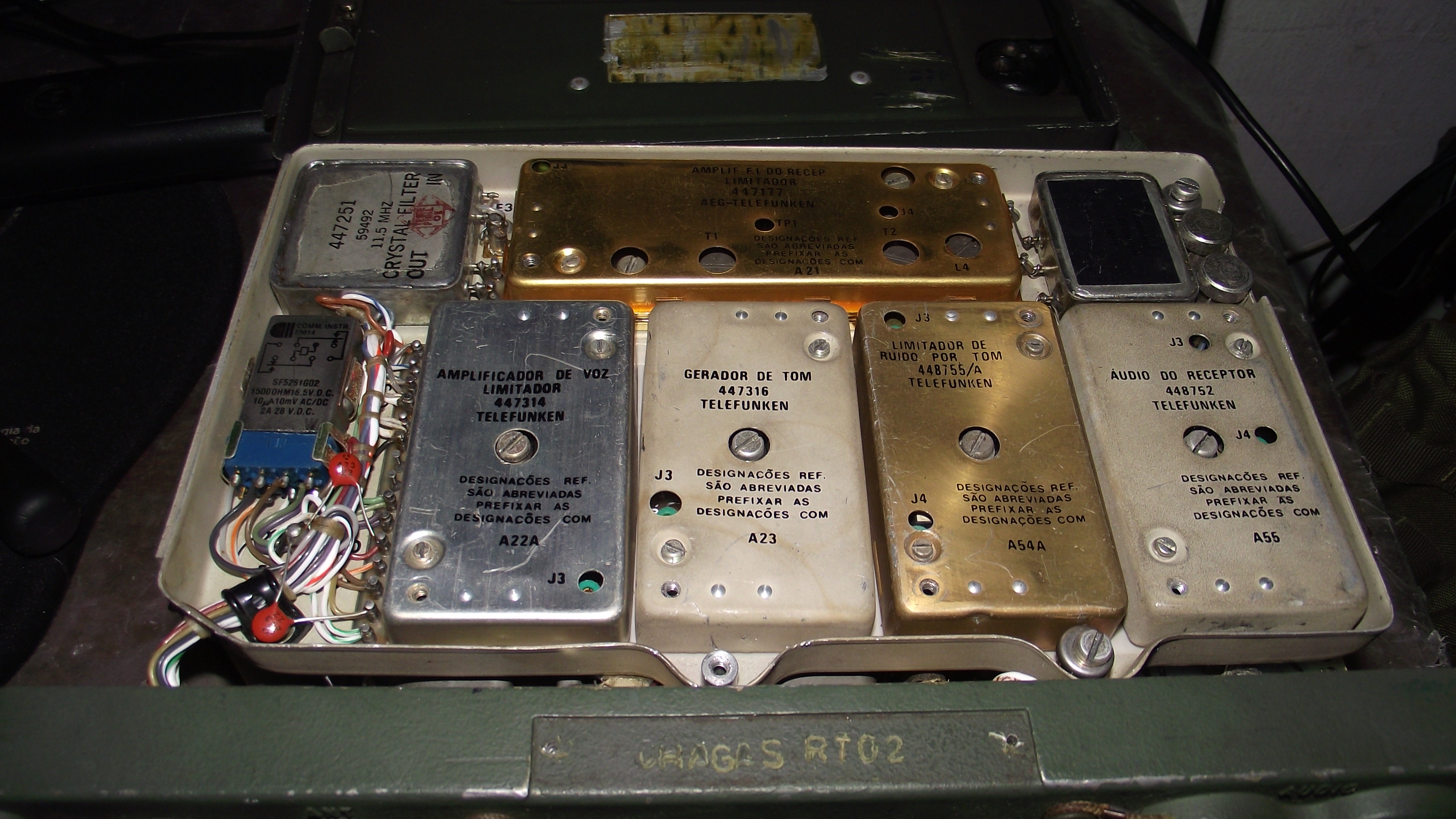

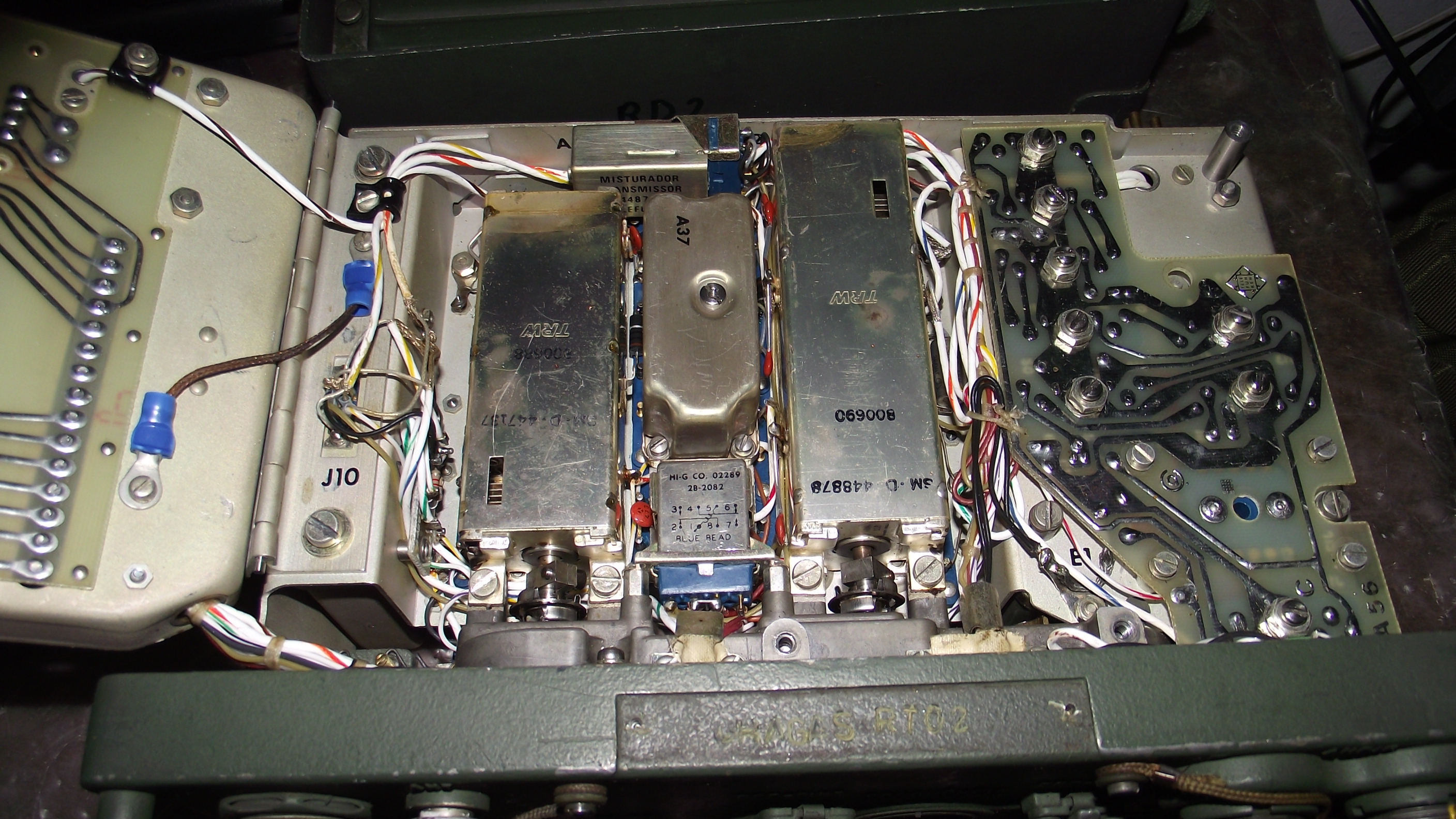

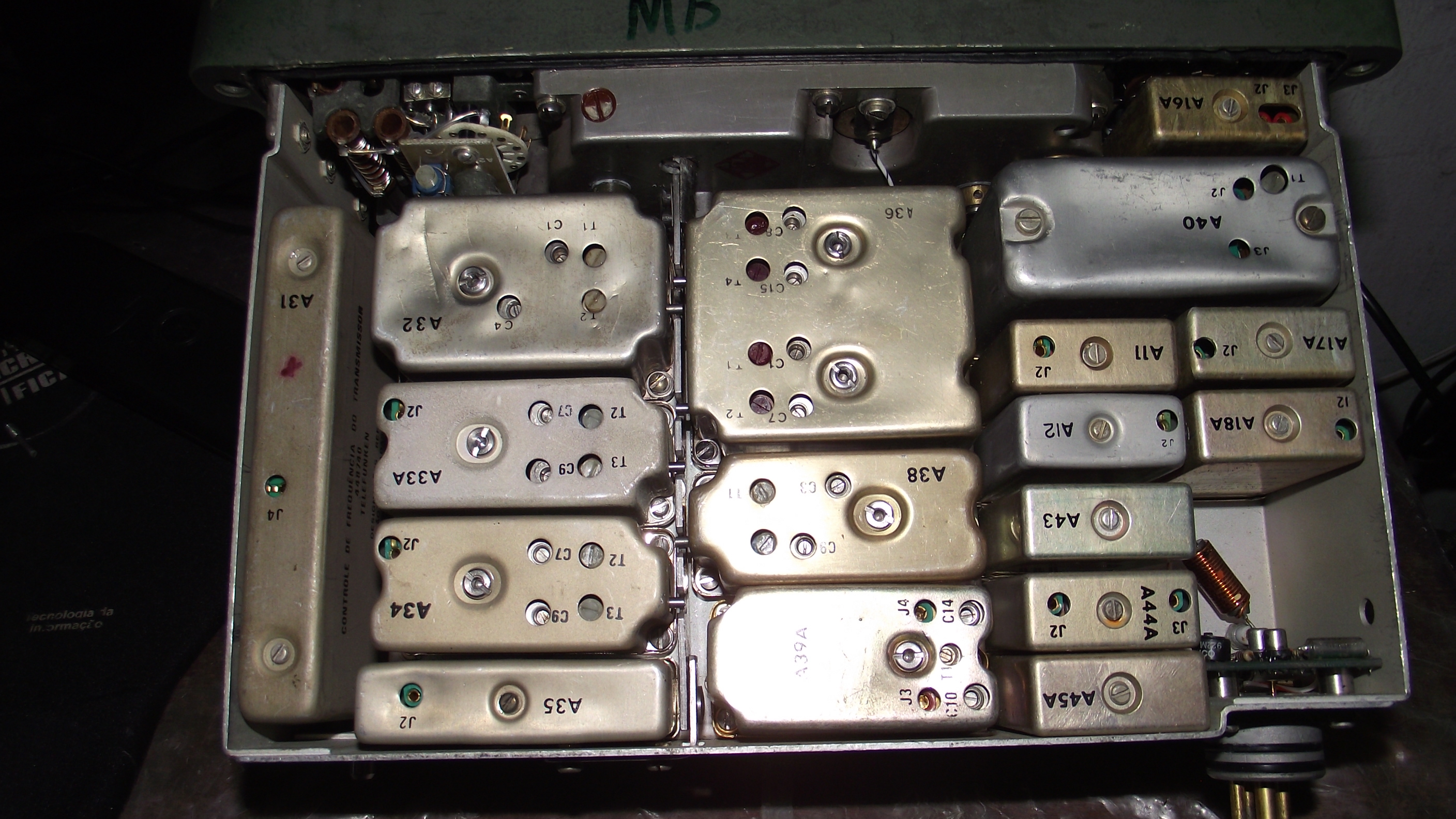

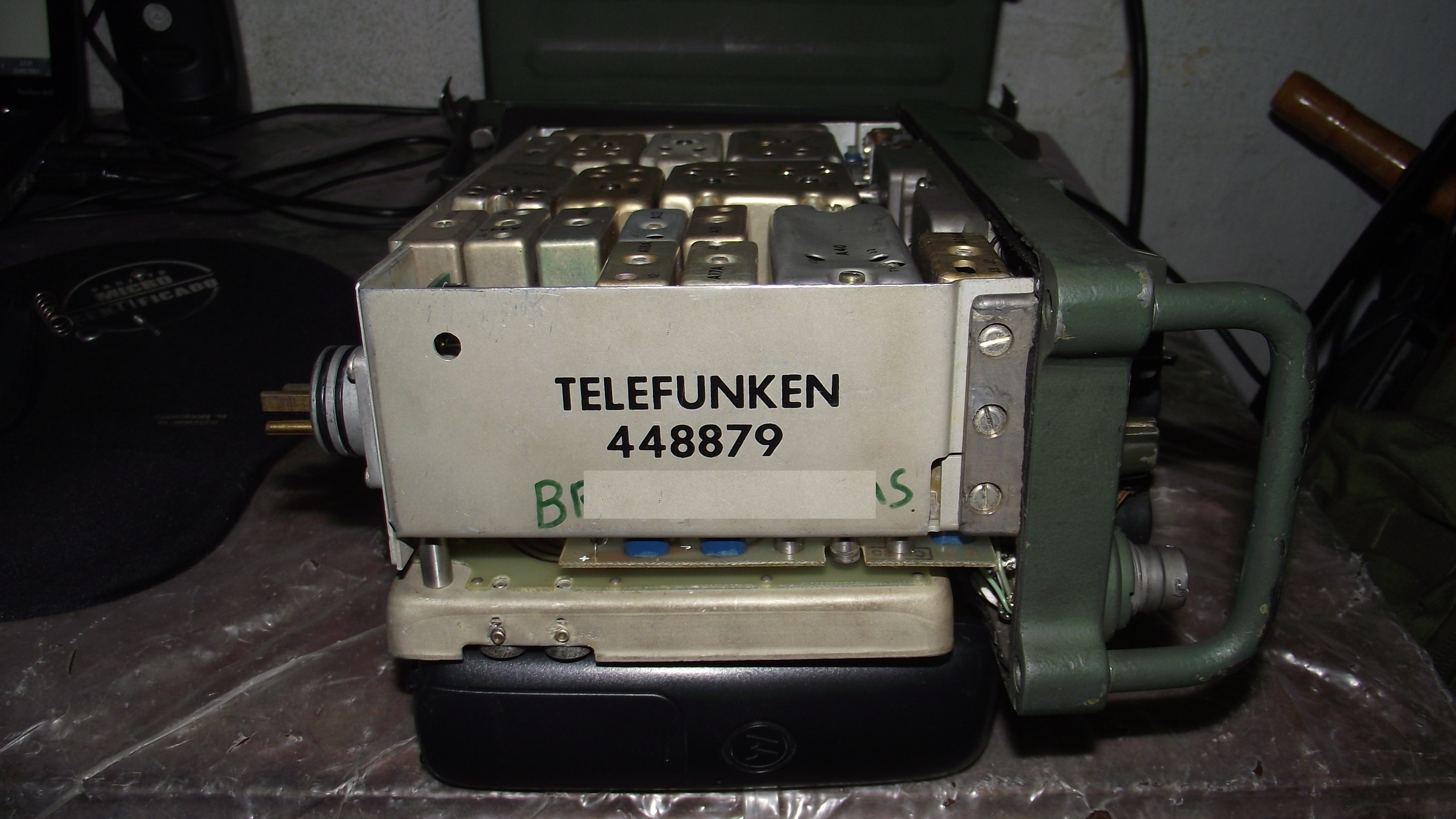

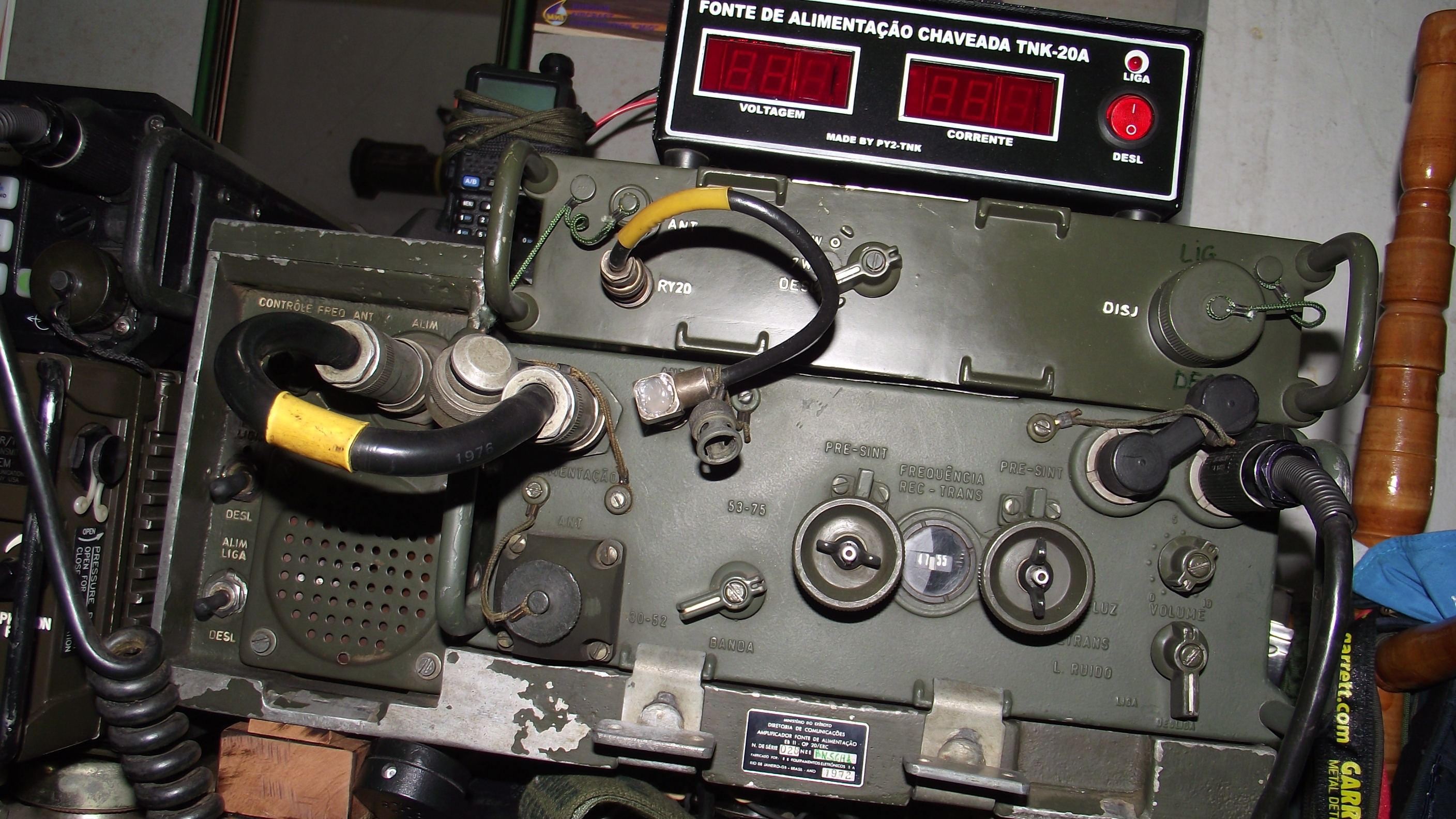

== See also ==
- List of military electronics of the United States
