= KY-58 =

Secure voice module

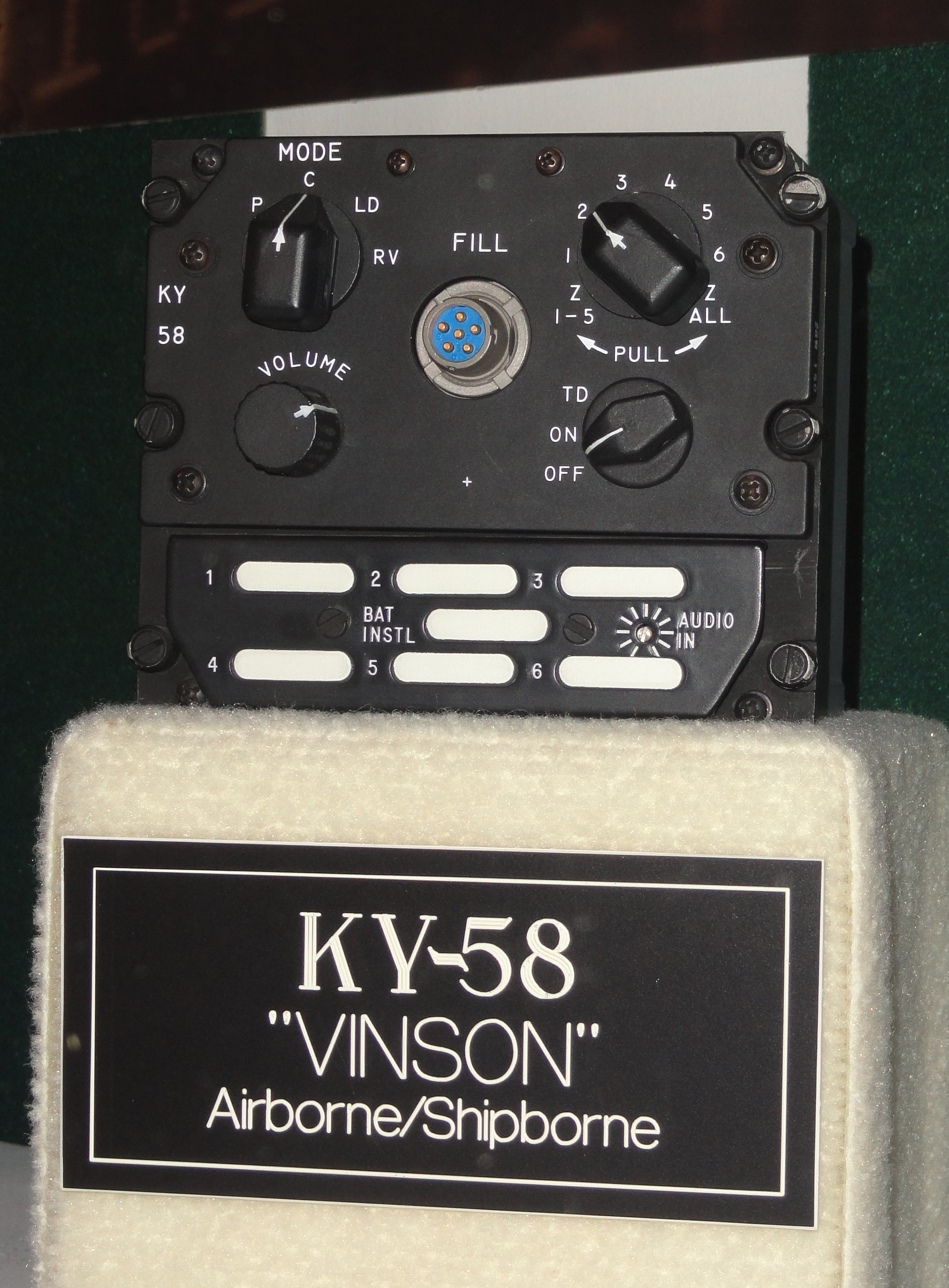
KY-58 VINSON at the National Cryptologic Museum

The VINSON KY-58 is a secure voice module used to encrypt radio communication to and from military aircraft and other tactical vehicles. It is employed by U.S. Military Joint Services, NATO and some law enforcement agencies. It is designed to operate over bandwidth-restricted circuits such as UHF and VHF satellite access and wideband switched telephone systems. It uses the 16 kbit/s continuously variable slope delta modulation (CVSD). The system was initially fielded as a replacement for the KG-36 and KG-34. The unit fits in a five-inch cube and weighs about 5 pounds. Production ended in 1993.

== See also ==
- KY-68
