= RT-841 =

RT-841 is the base component VHF radio transceiver used by the United States military in manpack and vehicular radio configurations, including the AN/PRC-77 (manpack), AN/VRC-64 (vehicular) and the AN/GRC-160 (vehicular with manpack accessories). These radio systems were employed in the US Army and US Marine Corps from the Vietnam Era to the present.

A follow-on radio system and ultimate replacement for this transceiver is the SINCGARS.
