= Multi Rolle Radio =

Norwegian-founded modular radio set

Multi Rolle Radio (English: Multi Role Radio) is a modular radio set which supports high speed frequency hopping and strong encryption. It was ordered in early 1993 and first put to operative use in mid-1995.

It operates on standard military VHF frequencies ranging from 30.000 to 87.975 MHz.

The system was developed in Norway, mainly by Kongsberg Defence Communication and Thales Group Norway, with support from the Norwegian Defence Research Establishment. It has been exported to Hungary.

The radio is modular, and can be configured both as portable (PRC) and vehicle-mounted (VRC). The VRC can be fitted with two receive/transmit modules in a single mounting, for use as a relay.

Although most transmit specifications are classified, it is known that the radio uses Gaussian Minimum Shift Keying and M-ary encoding. It can also be used in an analog FM mode, in which it is compatible with other radios like AN/PRC-77 and civilian radios.

It has several features besides being a traditional radio set, amongst them message relaying of digital messages, cell area mobile capabilities and Digital Tadkom access.

The lighter, more mobile set for the Norwegian military is Lett Feltradio (Light field radio). This is fully interoperable with MRR both in plain and encrypted mode.

Technical Characteristics
Data	Portable	Vehicle
Frequency Range:	30.00 to 79.95 MHz	30.00 to 79.95 MHz
Planning Range:	classified	classified
Power Output:	10 mW to 5 W	10 mW to 50 W
Power Source:	BB-500N rechargeable NiCd; BB-5500N single use Li-SO_{2} BB-2500N rechargeable	24 VDC
Antenna:	AS-3010N flexible tape AS-3012N multisection	AS-3030N roof mounted 3,3m AS-102 mast mounted
Weight:	Approximately 10 kg	Approximately 20 kg
