= KY-68 =

Tactical telephone system

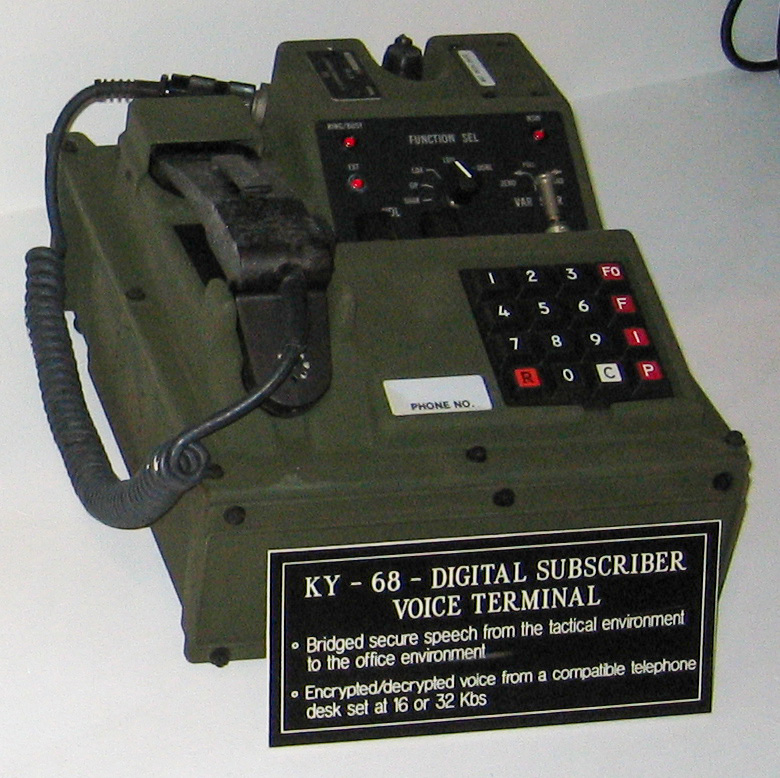
KY-68 tactical secure telephone

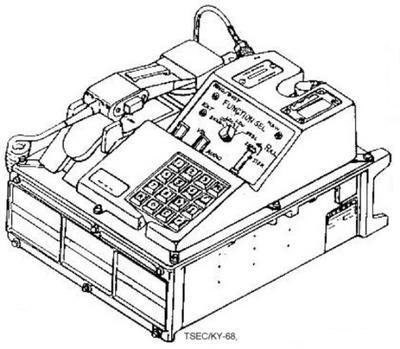
TSEC/KY68 Basic Unit

TSEC/KY-68 DSVT, commonly known as Digital Subscriber Voice Terminal, is a US military ruggedized, full- or half-duplex tactical telephone system with a built-in encryption/decryption module for secure traffic.

It transmits voice and data at 16 or 32 kbit/s, converting voice to a digital signal. The KY-68 can operate via civilian and military switches in either encrypted or un-encrypted mode, or point-to-point (encrypted mode only).

Although used primarily for secure communications, the KY-68 can also transmit to a Digital Non-secure Voice Terminal (DNVT). A local switch warns the KY-68 user with a tone signal when initiating communication with a non-secure terminal.

The KY-68 is keyed using an Electronic Transfer Device, typically either a KYK-13 or AN/CYZ-10.

An almost identical office version (KY-78) features the same electronics as the KY-68, but has an exterior casing composed of lighter materials.

The KY-68 and KY-78 are approved for use with SECRET-classified information.

== See also ==
- KY-58
