= VINSON =

Family of voice encryption devices

VINSON is a family of voice encryption devices used by U.S. and allied military and law enforcement, based on the NSA's classified Suite A SAVILLE encryption algorithm and 16 kbit/s CVSD audio compression. It replaces the Vietnam War-era NESTOR (KY-8/KY-28|28/KY-38|38) family.

These devices provide tactical secure voice on UHF and VHF line of sight (LOS), UHF SATCOM communication and tactical phone systems. These terminals are unclassified Controlled Cryptographic Items (CCI) when unkeyed and classified to the keymat of the key when going secure.

VINSON devices include:

- KY-57
- KY-58
- KY-68
- KY-99a (MINTERM)
- KY-100 (AIRTERM)
- KYV-2
- FASCINATOR

VINSON is embedded into many modern military radios, such as SINCGARS. Many multi-algorithm COMSEC modules are also backwards-compatible with VINSON.

== See also ==
- Advanced Narrowband Digital Voice Terminal (ANDVT) system for low bandwidth secure voice communications that replaced VINSON.
