= Whip-a-way =

Folding antenna

The Whip-a-way was a type of folding whip antenna. It was popular with users of Citizens band radio, and also had military uses.

== Versions ==
=== Consumer ===
Whip-A-Way folding antenna

The Whip-a-way is a seven-section, tubular, folding whip antenna. A plastic-covered cable (or braided plastic cord) under spring tension is threaded through the sections to keep them together when assembled for operation and prevent their separation or loss when disassembled. Spring tension is provided by a spiral spring in the base section. An antenna top cap installed on the tip of the antenna provides protection for personnel. The construction is the same as is used for sectional fishing poles. The base has a male 3/8-24 thread which is the same as is used on most ham radio and CB antennas.

The antenna was 9 feet long when fully assembled. The product was distributed by South Shore Distributing of Hempstead, New York. It was popular during the 'CB craze' of the late 1970s - early 1980s.

=== Military ===
A military version (AT-271A) was manufactured by various military subcontractors, consisted of seven sections, 7.5 feet long when fully assembled.

Each of the seven hollow tubular metal sections has a plug on one end and a socket on the other end. All the sections are connected by a string made of either a cloth or metal cord. At the bottom of the base element there is a spring inside the tube to tension the cord. This way all the elements are kept in order when they are disconnected from each other and are held together when assembled.
