= TADKOM =

Norwegian military communications system

TADKOM / TAktisk Digital KOMunikasjon (English: TADCOM / TActical Digital COMmunication) is an encrypted network used as a carrier for most of the communication for all four branches of the Norwegian military. Most nodes operate on a speed of 2mbit and above. TADKOM is also used to carry signals such as Link-11, Link-11B, Link-16 and Link-22(Future). The system use the X.25 protocol to communicate between the nodes.

TADKOM is classified for Nato Secret and National Secret without any additional encryption devices.
