= List of telecommunications encryption terms =

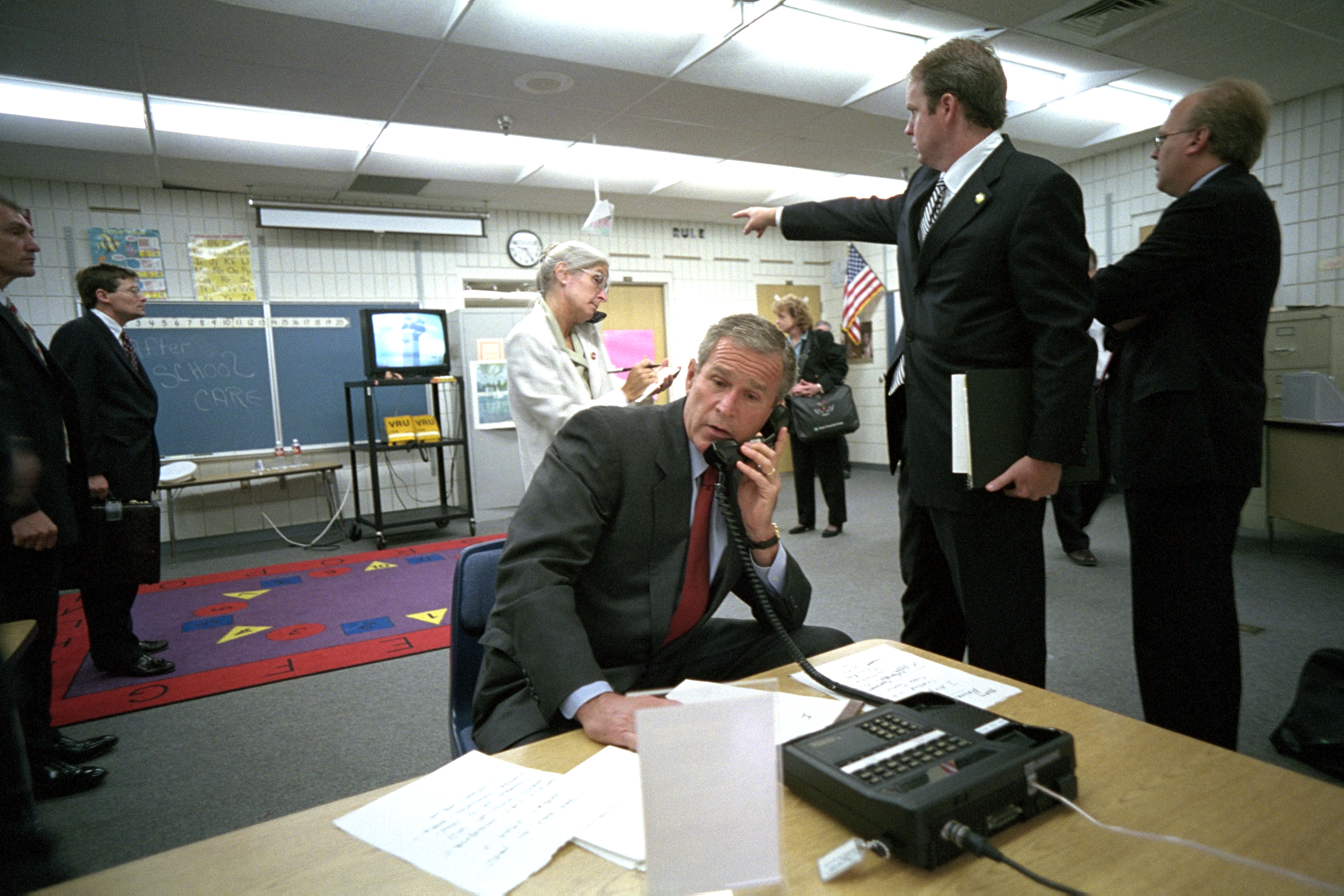
George W. Bush using a Motorola STU-III immediately after the September 11 attacks

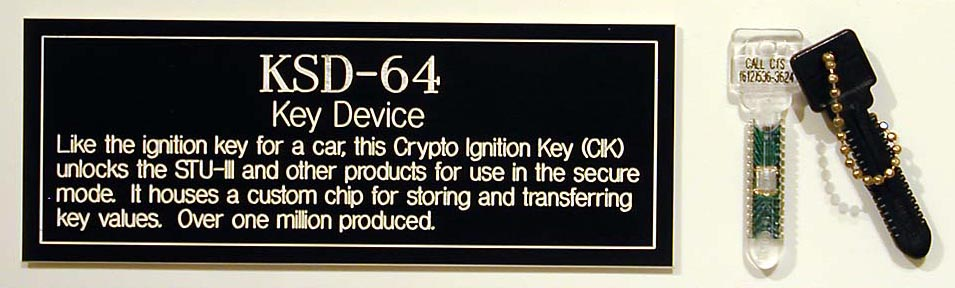
KSD-64 "Crypto-ignition keys" on display at the National Cryptologic Museum in 2005

This is a list of telecommunications encryption terms. This list is derived in part from the Glossary of Telecommunication Terms published as Federal Standard 1037C.

- A5/1 – a stream cipher used to provide over-the-air communication privacy in the GSM cellular telephone standard.
- Bulk encryption
- Cellular Message Encryption Algorithm – a block cipher which was used for securing mobile phones in the United States.
- Cipher
- Cipher device
- Cipher system
- Cipher text
- Ciphony
- Civision
- Codress message
- COMSEC equipment
- Cryptanalysis
- Cryptographic key
- CRYPTO (International Cryptology Conference)
- Crypto phone
- Crypto-shredding
- Data Encryption Standard (DES)
- Decipher
- Decode
- Decrypt
- DECT Standard Cipher
- Descrambler
- Dncipher
- Encode
- Encoding law
- Encrypt
- End-to-end encryption
- group
- IMSI-catcher – an eavesdropping device used for interception of cellular phones and usually is undetectable for users of mobile phones.
- Key distribution center (KDC)
- Key management
- Key stream
- KSD-64
- Link encryption
- MISTY1
- Multiplex link encryption
- Net control station (NCS)
- Null cipher
- One-time pad
- Over the Air Rekeying (OTAR)
- Plaintext
- PPPoX
- Protected distribution system (PDS)
- Protection interval (PI)
- Pseudorandom number generator
- Public-key cryptography
- RED/BLACK concept
- RED signal
- Remote rekeying
- Security management
- Spoofing
- Squirt – to load or transfer code key from an electronic key storage device. See Over the Air Rekeying.
- STU-III – a family of secure telephones introduced in 1987 by the National Security Agency for use by the United States government, its contractors, and its allies.
- Superencryption
- Synchronous crypto-operation
- Transmission security key (TSK)
- Trunk encryption device (TED)
- Types 1, 2, 3, and 4 encryption
- Unique key
- VoIP VPN – combines voice over IP and virtual private network technologies to offer a method for delivering secure voice.
- ZRTP – a cryptographic key-agreement protocol used in Voice over Internet Protocol (VoIP) phone telephony.

== See also ==
- Communications security
- CONDOR secure cell phone
- Cryptography standards
- Secure communication
- Secure telephone
- Telecommunications
