= KIK-30 =

Fill device

The KIK-30 "Really Simple Key loader" (RASKL) is a fill device made by Sypris Electronics and approved by the US National Security Agency for the distribution of NSA Type 1 cryptographic keys. It can also store and transfer related communications security material, including control data ("load sets") for frequency hopping radios, such as SINCGARS and Have Quick. It can store up to 40 cryptographic keys and has male and female U-229 connectors for the NSA DS-101 and 102 fill protocol, allowing it to be plugged into most other NSA fill devices and EKMS equipment. It is 6.14 inches (159 mm) long, weighs less than one pound (454 g) and is powered by four AAA batteries. The operator interface has an 8 line of 20 characters and 6 buttons, with what Sypris calls "1-button key squirt" and 2-button zeroize (clear memory).

A simpler device than the AN/CYZ-10, the KIK-30 is now planned to replace the venerable KYK-13 fill devices, with up to $200 million budgeted in 2009 to procure the newer units in quantity.
