= Cryptographic High Value Product =

Cryptographic High Value Product (CHVP) is a designation used within the information security community to identify assets that have high value, and which may be used to encrypt / decrypt secure communications, but which do not retain or store any classified information. When disconnected from the secure communication network, the CHVP equipment may be handled with a lower level of controls than required for COMSEC equipment.

== See also ==
- COMSEC
- CCI
- Multibook
