= Multibook =

A Multibook or a TACLANE Multibook is a single laptop that combines two to three different classified networks into a single device solution. Currently, most secure computing standards require the federal government and military personnel to maintain multiple PCs on different networks in an effort to allow users simultaneous access to unclassified and classified information. A multibook simply through a complex configuration allows separate enclaves and virtual machines through one display. A Multibook has no hard drive and uses a cryptographic ignition key to create a virtual hard drive space with a Type 1 COMSEC element found inside the MultiBook’s integrated Suite B security module.

The security module known as a HAIPE protects information stored on the computer, as well as data being sent to and from networks classified Secret and below. Due to the lack of stored collateral data, multiBooks do not have any burdensome COMSEC handling requirements. There is no Data at Rest (DAR) when equipment is turned off.

Some multibooks are NSA certified to protect information classified Secret and below. They are approved for Suite B information/processing with data in transit (DIT) encryption protecting information when sent to and from classified networks.

The multibook security benefit for the user is that the device is a CHVP device and is not considered CCI like other devices used in collateral processing.
