= AN/ARC-182 =

US military aircraft VHF/UHF radio transceiver

The AN/ARC-182 is a family of military aircraft radio transceivers designed for two-way, multi-mode voice communications over a 30 to 400 MHz frequency range. It covers both Ultra High Frequency (UHF) and Very High Frequency (VHF) bands with AM, FM, as appropriate. The ARC-182 radio supports the HAVE QUICK II anti-jam waveforms, with an optional control unit. It features a guard channel capability for monitoring 40.5, 121.5, 156.8 and 243 MHz. Transmitter minimum power is 10 watts, AM, and 15 watts, FM. The RT-1250A model radio can communicate with other avionics over a MIL-STD-1553 data bus.

In accordance with the Joint Electronics Type Designation System (JETDS), the "AN/ARC-182" designation represents the 182nd design of an Army-Navy airborne electronic device for radio communications equipment. The JETDS system also now is used to name all Department of Defense electronic systems.

== Development ==
Developed in the late 1970s, the ARC-182s were manufactured by Rockwell Collins and are installed in a range of U.S. Navy, Marines and Coast Guard aircraft. Its frequency range includes the following bands:

- VHF 30-88 MHz FM close air support
- VHF 108-118 MHz AM navigation, receive only
- VHF 118-156 MHz AM air traffic control
- VHF 156-174 MHz FM maritime
- UHF 225-400 MHz AM/FM military/NATO

A single ARC-182 radio allowed pilots to communicate with ground forces for close air support, civilian air traffic control and military UHF-AM users, a unique capability at the time. The ARC-182 (V) version added the ability to communicate with commercial shipping and UHF-FM systems. The -182(V) version added VHF-FM maritime and UHF-FM capabilities. The radio's utility has attracted international attention; the set is being used in 35 countries.

Channel spacing is 25 kHz in all bands.

The transceiver weights about 10 lb (4.54 kg). Available accessories include remote controls, transmit power amplifiers, antennas, and ground support equipment. It has been largely replaced by the AN/ARC-210 series in U.S. systems. The ARC-210 is an improved version of the ARC-182, adding jam-reisistant SINCGARS capability to communicate with Army radios for close air support.

The ARC-182 was used in over 40 different U.S. fixed wing and rotary aircraft, as well as in ground, transportable and mobile applications, and was in service in 42 countries. Starting in 1994, the ARC-182, along with the UHF-only ARC-187, was used to upgrade the U.S. Navy's fleet of Lockheed P-3 Orions to add satellite and HaveQuick capabilities and to meet newer civilian air traffic control requirements.

== See also ==
- List of military electronics of the United States
