= Transmission security =

Component of communications security

Transmission security (TRANSEC) is the component of communications security (COMSEC) that results from the application of measures designed to protect transmissions from interception and exploitation by means other than cryptanalysis. Goals of transmission security include:

- Low probability of interception (LPI)
- Low probability of detection (LPD)
- Antijam — resistance to jamming (EPM or ECCM)

This involves securing communication links from being compromised by techniques like jamming, eavesdropping, and signal interception. TRANSEC includes the use of frequency hopping, spread spectrum and the physical protection of communication links to obscure the patterns of transmission. It is particularly vital in military and government communication systems, where the security of transmitted data is critical to prevent adversaries from gathering intelligence or disrupting operations. TRANSEC is often implemented alongside COMSEC (Communications Security) to form a comprehensive approach to communication security.

Methods used to achieve transmission security include frequency hopping and spread spectrum where the required pseudorandom sequence generation is controlled by a cryptographic algorithm and key. Such keys are known as transmission security keys (TSK). Modern U.S. and NATO TRANSEC-equipped radios include SINCGARS and HAVE QUICK.

== See also ==
- Electronic warfare
