= KOV-21 =

The KOV-21 is a cryptographic PC card module developed under the auspices of the U.S. National Security Agency and manufactured by Sypris Electronics LLC. It is intended to be the cryptographic engine for next generation key management devices, such as the AN/PYQ-10 key loader, as part of the U.S. Government's Cryptographic Modernization Initiative. Sypris was awarded a contract for production of KOV-21 units in November 2007.
