= AN/ARC-231 =

US military aircraft software-defined VHF/UHF/SATCOM radio

The AN/ARC-231 Skyfire is a software-definable radio for military aircraft that provides two-way, multi-mode voice and data communications over a 30 to 512 MHz frequency range. It covers both line-of-sight Ultra High Frequency (UHF) and Very High Frequency (VHF) bands with AM, FM and SATCOM capabilities, including Integrated Waveform (IW). The ARC-231 radio also includes embedded anti-jam waveforms, including HAVE QUICK and SINCGARS, and other data link and secure communications features, providing battlefield interoperability. The radios utilize the MIL-STD-1553 data bus.

The ARC-231s are manufactured by BAE Systems and are installed in a wide range of helicopters and some fixed-wing aircraft, across all the U.S. military services. Available accessories include remote controls, transmit power amplifiers, SATCOM preamplifiers, and ground support equipment. As of 2012, over 5000 radios had been fielded.

A related radio by Raytheon, the AN/ARC-232, has similar line-of-sight capabilities but is designed to be a form-fit replacement for the older, UHF-only AN/ARC-164.

In accordance with the Joint Electronics Type Designation System (JETDS), the "AN/ARC-231" designation represents the 231st design of an Army-Navy airborne electronic device for radio communications equipment. The JETDS system also now is used to name all Department of Defense electronic systems.

== See also ==
- AN/ARC-210 similar radio made by Rockwell Collins
- List of military electronics of the United States
