= AN/ARC-164 =

US military UHF aircraft radio system

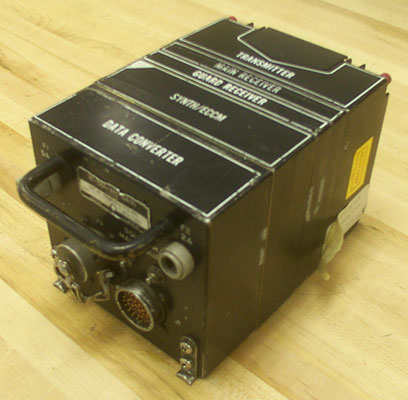
ARC-164 Receiver/Transmitter (RT-1504) used for remote installations.

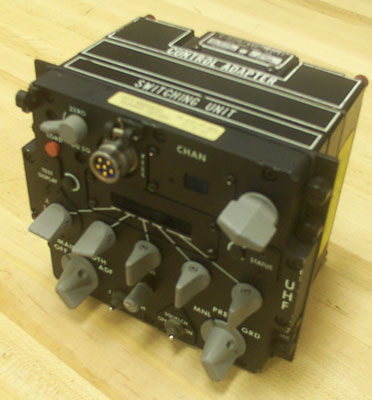
ARC-164 Control Panel (C-11719) used for remote installations.

The AN/ARC-164 is a US military UHF aircraft radio that operates in the aeronautical mobile (OR) service / B band (NATO). It was first introduced in 1981 and might be found on B-52G/H, B-1B, C/EC/RC-26D, C-5, KC-135, C-23, C-130, C-141, F-15, A-10, F-16, UH-1D, CH-47, H-53, H-60 and S-3B aircraft.

== System Description ==
The ARC-164 is a military UHF AM aircraft station that operates between 225-399.975 MHz (the NATO harmonised UHF band 225-400 MHz is also a subset of this particular band as defined by the NJFA) and transmits at 10 watts. It features a separate guard receiver for monitoring 243 MHz while simultaneously monitoring the active channel selected, an ECCM slice capable of storing multiple Word-of-Day patterns for Havequick operation, and can also serve as a channel selector and audio demodulator for separate UHF DF systems. There are 2 common installations: remote and panel. With a remote installation, the R/T is in a remote location, while the panel installation features an all-in-one R/T and control panel.

In accordance with the Joint Electronics Type Designation System (JETDS), the "AN/ARC-164" designation represents the 164th design of an Army-Navy airborne electronic device for radio communications equipment. The JETDS system also now is used to name all Department of Defense electronic systems.

== See also ==
- List of military electronics of the United States
- Aircraft station, Radiocommunication service
- AN/ARC-232 replacement
