= AN/PYQ-10 =

Handheld fill device

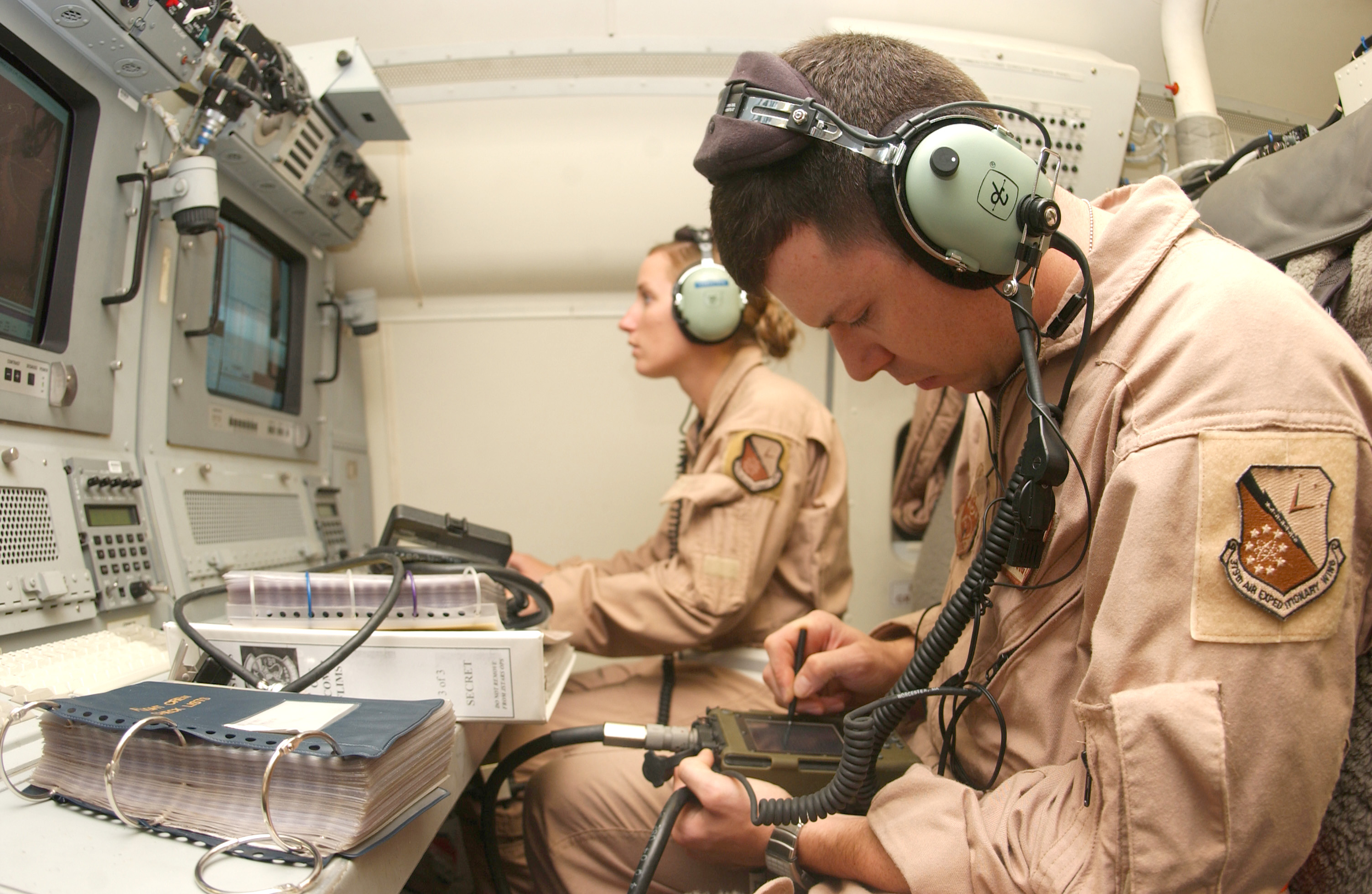
An E-8 crew member entering data using an AN/PYQ-10 before a flight

The AN/PYQ-10 Simple Key Loader (SKL) is a ruggedized, portable, hand-held fill device, for securely receiving, storing, and transferring data between compatible cryptographic and communications equipment. The SKL was designed and built by Sierra Nevada Corporation, with software developed by Science Applications International Corporation (SAIC) under the auspices of the United States Army. It is intended to supplement and eventually replace the AN/CYZ-10 Data Transfer Device (DTD). The PYQ-10 provides all the functions currently resident in the CYZ-10 and incorporates new features that provide streamlined management of COMSEC key, Electronic Protection (EP) data, and Signal Operating Instructions (SOI). Cryptographic functions are performed by an embedded KOV-21 card developed by the National Security Agency (NSA). The AN/PYQ-10 supports both the DS-101 and DS-102 interfaces, as well as the KSD-64 Crypto Ignition Key. The SKL is backward-compatible with existing End Cryptographic Units (ECU) and forward-compatible with future security equipment and systems, including NSA's Key Management Infrastructure.

Between 2005 and 2007, the U.S. Army budget included funds for over 24,000 SKL units. The estimated price for FY07 was $1708 each. When released in May 2005, the price was $1695 each. This price includes the unit and the internal encryptor card.

In accordance with the Joint Electronics Type Designation System (JETDS), the "AN/PYQ-10" designation represents the 10th design of an Army-Navy electronic device for portable data processing special equipment. The JETDS system also now is used to name all Department of Defense electronic systems.

== Replacement ==
In February 2022, the U.S. Army's Program Executive Office Command, Control, Communications-Tactical awarded General Dynamics Mission Systems a $229 million indefinite-delivery/indefinite-quantity contract to design and build the Next Generation Load Device-Medium (NGLD-M), an NSA-certified successor intended to replace aging Simple Key Loader units across U.S. government agencies and allied partners. The Army planned to procure up to 265,000 units over the contract's ten-year period of performance.

== See also ==
- List of military electronics of the United States
