= Over-the-air rekeying =

Encryption key transmission method

Over-the-air rekeying (OTAR) refers to transmitting or updating encryption keys (rekeying) in secure information systems by conveying the keys via encrypted electronic communication channels ("over the air"). It is also referred to as over-the-air transfer (OTAT), or over-the-air distribution (OTAD), depending on the specific type, use, and transmission means of the key being changed. Although the acronym refers specifically to radio transmission, the technology is also employed via wire, cable, or optical fiber.

As a "paperless encryption key system" OTAR was originally adopted specifically in support of high speed data communications because previously known "paperless key" systems such as supported by Diffie-Hellman key exchange, or Firefly key exchange technology (as used in the now obsolete STU-III "scrambled" telephone) were not capable of handling the high speed transmission volumes required by normal governmental/military communications traffic. Now also adopted for civilian and commercial secure voice use, especially by emergency first responders, OTAR has become not only a security technology, but a preferred basis of communications security doctrine world-wide. The term "OTAR" is now basic to the lexicon of communications security.

== History ==
OTAR technology created by NSA inventor, innovator, and author, Mahlon Doyle was operationally introduced to the US Department of Defense in 1988. Lieutenant Commander David Winters, an American naval officer in London and code master during the final years of the Cold War, was first to recognize the necessity and security potential of OTAR. In order to exploit the advantages of this technology, he conceived and initiated its first large scale practical application and deployment.

Due to the efficiency and vast cost savings inherent to OTAR, Commander Winters' methods were quickly adopted and spread Navy-wide, following which Vice Admiral J.O Tuttle, Commander of the Navy Telecommunications Command, the Navy "J6", shortly influenced the Joint Chiefs of Staff to bring all the other military services into compliance. In due course, OTAR shortly became the NATO standard.

This coincided with the introduction of newer NSA cryptographic systems that use a 128-bit electronic key, such as the ANDVT, KY-58, KG-84A/C, and KY-75, capable of obtaining new or updated keys via the circuit they protect or other secure communications circuits. Adoption of OTAR reduces requirements both for the distribution of physical keying material and the physical process of loading cryptographic devices with key tapes.

Accordingly, OTAR eliminates the need for individual stations to be involved with physical key changeovers. Instead, electronically transmitted keys would normally come from a network control station (NCS). The OTAT feature permits a key to be extracted from an OTAT-capable cryptographic system using a fill device, such as the KYK-13 or KYX-15/KYX-15A and then loaded ("squirted") into another cryptographic system as needed. Alternatively, encryption systems may also be configured to automatically receive and update code keys with virtually no manual intervention, as is the case for GPS (Global Positioning System) navigation satellite signals.

== Present and future ==
Now that OTAR applications have been adapted for civilian emergency service providers and other users requiring enhanced communications security, extensive parallel technology conversion and development have produced commercially viable systems that include end-to-end key generation, distribution, management, and control. Network controllers can remotely, dependably, and securely change encryption keys for an entire network at their discretion. This simplifies and streamlines operations while virtually eliminating risk of compromise. In practical terms, this means users need not bring or return their units for manual updates, nor must technicians visit each user, station, or node to service their units in the field. Further, in the unlikely event that a unit, station, or node is stolen, mimicked, or otherwise compromised, a network controller may:

- Remotely inhibit access of additional users, stations, or nodes to the network.
- Remotely and securely enable network access to additional users, stations, or nodes.
- Remotely "zeroize" or remove a user's, station's, or node's cryptographic key material.
- Remotely and securely change or update a user’s, station's, or node's cryptographic keys.

== Significance ==
Telecommunications protected by encryption require proprietary or classified keys to lock and unlock them. Security of such telecommunications is no greater than the security of its keys. Therefore, key protection is paramount. So long as use of encryption remains reasonably limited, key security is realistically manageable. However, in the mid-twentieth century, military and diplomatic telecommunications loads grew by orders of magnitude. Encryption systems became automated and key quantities ballooned.

These encryption keys usually comprised printed sheets, punched paper strips or cards, or electromagnetic tapes. The security of their production, transport, storage, distribution, accounting, employment, and finally destruction required thousands of trusted agents, world-wide. Vulnerability of so many physical keys to theft or loss became a statistical reality that was exploited for two decades by the infamous "Johnny Walker" spy ring. Elimination of this vulnerability through adoption of Over The Air Rekeying (OTAR) although little appreciated at the time, was an innovation of inestimable impact. Placing this technology in perspective, OTAR comprised a transformation at the most basic foundations of communications security such that through the decades since introduction of OTAR, not a single new breach of US code systems has occurred. Introduction of OTAR technology into practical application precipitated NSA creation of the Electronic Key Management System (EKMS) which permanently altered the power balance in communications security and espionage. Recent declassification of the details relating to its introduction may be expected to now become the subject of more scholarly work.

== Vulnerabilities ==
Vulnerabilities due to accidental, unencrypted “In the clear” transmissions have been demonstrated with systems incorporating OTAR as implemented in Project 25 Digital Mobile Radio Communications Standards.
