= AN/ARC-210 =

US military aircraft VHF/UHF/SATCOM radio

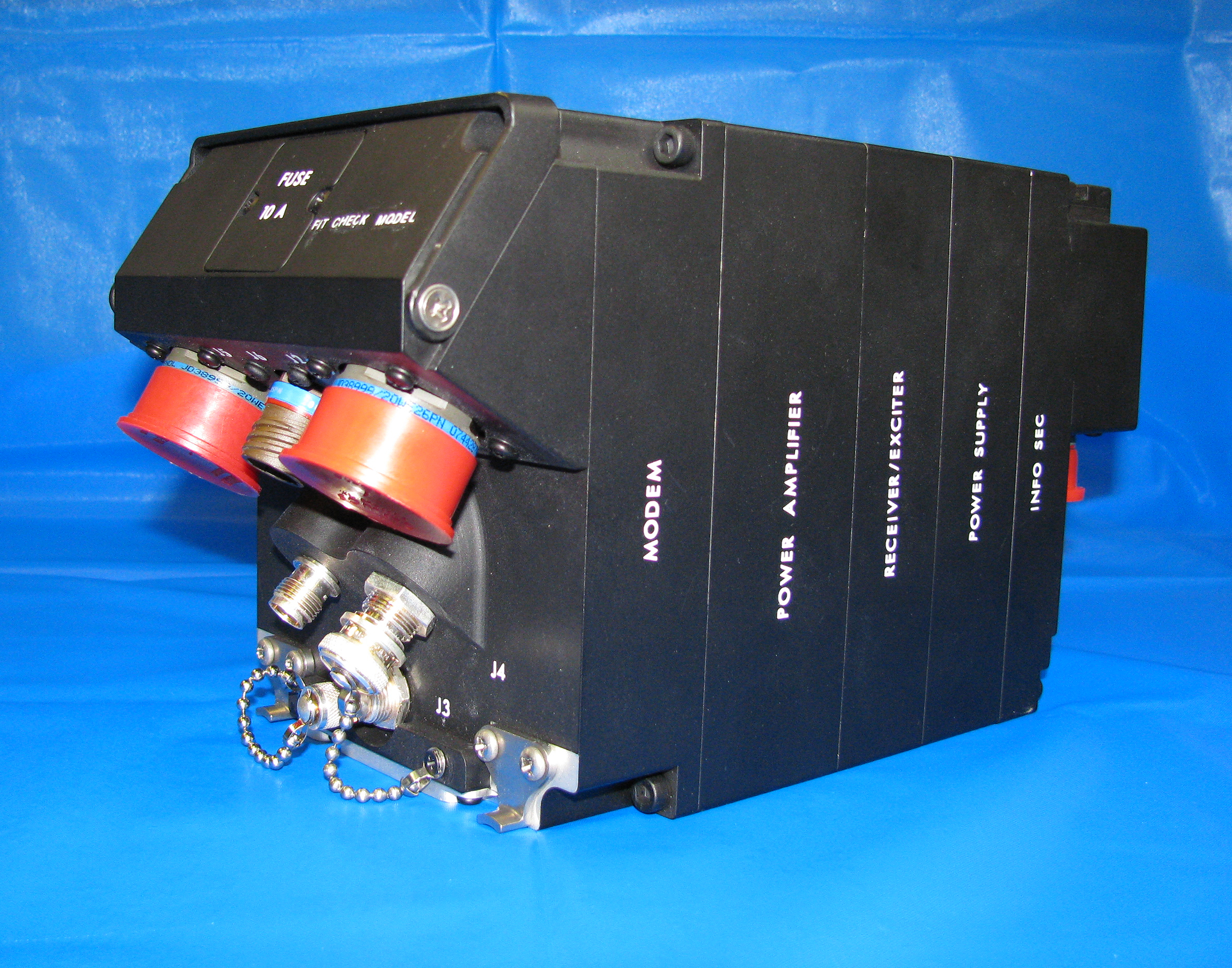
RT-1939/ARC-210 fifth generation receiver/transmitter unit

The AN/ARC-210 is a family of radios for military aircraft that provides two-way, multi-mode voice and data communications over a 30 to 512+ MHz frequency range. It covers both Ultra High Frequency (UHF) and Very High Frequency (VHF) bands with AM, FM and SATCOM capabilities. The ARC-210 radio also includes embedded anti-jam waveforms, including Havequick and SINCGARS, and other data link and secure communications features, providing total battlefield interoperability and high-performance capabilities in the transfer of data, voice and imagery. It features a separate guard receiver for monitoring 121.5 and 243 MHz while simultaneously monitoring the active channel selected. Transmitter power ranges from 5 to 23 watts, depending on frequency and mode. The radios communicates with other avionics over a MIL-STD-1553 data bus.

The ARC-210s are manufactured by Rockwell Collins and are installed in a wide range of aircraft, helicopters and ships across all five U.S. military services. The ARC-210 program began in 1990 as an improved version of the AN/ARC-182, adding jam-reisistant SINCGARS capability to communicate with Army radios for close air support. The Arc-210 is installed on more than 180 platforms and is operating in more than 40 countries. As of 2010, 30,000 have been produced and by October 2016, 40,000 delivered. The radios have generated over $2 billion in sales for the company.

In accordance with the Joint Electronics Type Designation System (JETDS), the "AN/ARC-210" designation represents the 210th design of an Army-Navy airborne electronic device for radio communications equipment. The JETDS system also now is used to name all Department of Defense electronic systems.

There are six generations of the radios. Models include the RT-1556, RT-1794, RT-1824, RT-1851, RT-1851A, and RT-1939, RT-1939A, RT-1990, RT-1990A and the RT-2036. The earliest model covered 30-400 MHz. The fifth generation RT-1939 is one of the first military radios to have software-programmable encryption under the National Security Agency’s (NSA) Cryptographic Modernization Initiative. Its frequency range is extended and includes the following bands:

- VHF 30-88 MHz close air support
- VHF 108-118 MHz navigation
- VHF 118-137 MHz air traffic control
- VHF 137-156 MHz land mobile
- VHF 156-174 MHz maritime
- UHF 225-512 MHz military/homeland defense
- UHF 806-824, 851-869, 869-902, 935-941 MHz public safety bands

Continuous Tone-Coded Squelch System (CTCSS), used by many public safety agencies, is available above 400 MHz and below 88 MHz.

The transceiver weighs about 12.2 lb (5.53 kg). Available accessories include remote controls, transmit power amplifiers, receive low-noise amplifiers, and ground support equipment.

== See also ==
- AN/ARC-231, similar radio produced by Raytheon
- List of military electronics of the United States
