= Dynamic secrets =

Dynamic Secrets is a novel key management scheme for secure communications. It was proposed by Sheng Xiao, Weibo Gong, and Don Towsley. The first academic publication had been nominated for INFOCOM 2010 best paper award. In 2012 a monograph was published by Springer to extend this scheme to a framework.

Dynamic secrets can be applied to all bi-directional communication systems and some single-directional communication systems to improve their communications security. There are three main benefits:

1. The encryption and authentication keys are rapidly and automatically updated for any pair of communication devices.

2. The key update process binds to the communication process and incurs negligible computing and bandwidth cost.

3. The use of a cloned key in either authentication or in encrypted communication is guaranteed to be detected. This detection has no false positives and does not cost any computing/networking resources. (Dynamic secrets automatically breaks the secure communication whenever a clone key and the legitimate key co-exist. To find out who is the attacker is, however, takes such resources.)

== Implementation ==
1. Infisical Dynamic Secrets
