= COMSEC Custodian =

A COMSEC custodian, or a COMSEC account manager per federal guidelines, is an individual designated to handle the receipt, transfer, accountability, safeguarding, and destruction of security communications assigned to any specific COMSEC account, and, they must hold an appropriate security clearance matching the level of classified material (up to Top Secret).

The COMSEC Custodian assumes control and accountability for the equipment or material upon receipt and then controls the publication and circulation to authorized individuals on a need to know basis. A series of COMSEC accounts is a COMSEC channel, and each Custodian is responsible for the materials on his or her channel and will distribute COMSEC information except that which is accountable in the COMSEC Material Control System. Any individual with access to COMSEC materials are requested to get approval before attempting travel outside of the US or to any establishments or facilities to avoid visiting coming into contact with adversaries of the US.
