= Encoding law =

Digital communications algorithm

In signal processing, an encoding law defines the relationship between input amplitude and its digital representation, determining the effective quantization step size across the signal. It's not a law, but an algorithm, implementation is typically non-uniform across possible analog signal levels in an analog-to-digital converter system, and can be viewed as a simple form of instantaneous companding.

The best-known encoding laws are the μ-law and A-law encoding laws defined in the ITU-T standard G.711 for use in digital telephony, and still used to the present day.
