= U-229 =

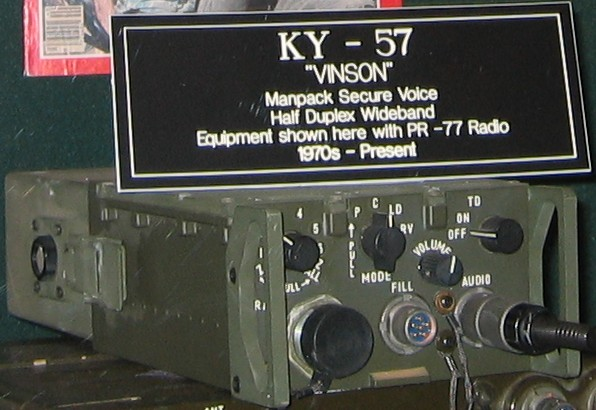
Front panel of KY-57 showing U-229 series fill connector in center.

The U-229 is a cable connector currently used by the U.S. military for audio connections to field radios, typically for connecting a handset. There are five-pin and six-pin versions, the sixth pin version using the extra pin to power accessories and being named U-329. This type of connector is also used by the National Security Agency to load cryptographic keys into encryption equipment from a fill device.

It is specified by the detail specification MIL-DTL-55116D.
