= Firefly (key exchange protocol) =

Firefly is a U.S. National Security Agency public-key key exchange protocol, used in EKMS, the STU-III secure telephone, and several other U.S. cryptographic systems.
