= Controlled Cryptographic Item =

Controlled Cryptographic Item (CCI) is a U.S. National Security Agency term for secure telecommunications or information handling equipment, an associated cryptographic component or any other hardware item which performs a critical communications security (COMSEC) function. Items so designated may be unclassified but are subject to special accounting controls and required markings.

== Security measures ==
Part of the physical security protection given to COMSEC equipment and material is afforded by its special handling and accounting. CCI equipment must be controlled in a manner that affords protection at least equal to other high value equipment, such as money, computers, and Privacy Act-controlled. There are two separate channels used for the handling of such equipment and materials: "the COMSEC channel" and "the administrative channel." The COMSEC channel, called the COMSEC Material Control System, is used to distribute accountable COMSEC items such as classified and CCI equipment, keying material, and maintenance manuals. Some military departments have been authorized to distribute CCI equipment through their standard logistics system.

== Accounts and restrictions ==
The COMSEC channel is composed of a series of COMSEC accounts, each of which has an appointed COMSEC Custodian who is personally responsible and accountable for all COMSEC materials charged to his/her account. The COMSEC Custodian assumes accountability for the equipment or material upon receipt, then controls its dissemination to authorized individuals on job requirements and a need-to-know basis. The administrative channel is used to distribute COMSEC information other than that which is accountable in the COMSEC Material Control System.

Persons with access to COMSEC materials are asked, among other restrictions, to avoid unapproved travel to any countries which are adversaries of the United States, or their establishments or facilities within the U.S.
