= Aircraft station =

Aeronautical mobile service radio station

An aircraft station (also aircraft radio station) is – according to Article 1.83 of the International Telecommunication Union's (ITU) ITU Radio Regulations (RR) – defined as "A mobile radio station in the aeronautical mobile service, other than survival craft station, located on board an aircraft".

Each station shall be classified by the service in which it operates permanently or temporarily.

See also

Selection of UHF/VHF aircraft stations

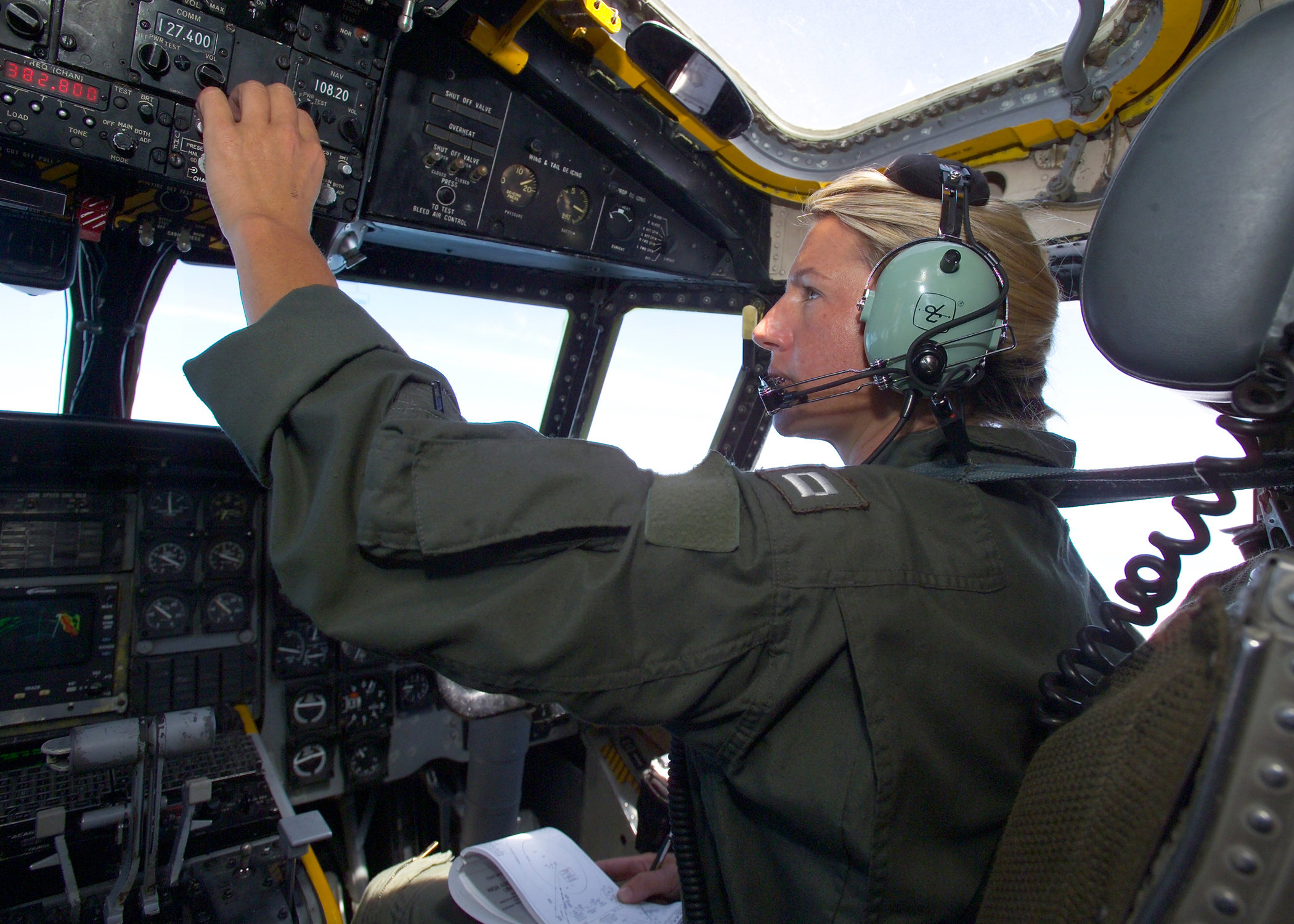
US Navy Grumman C-2 Greyhound used for Aeronautical mobile (OR) service

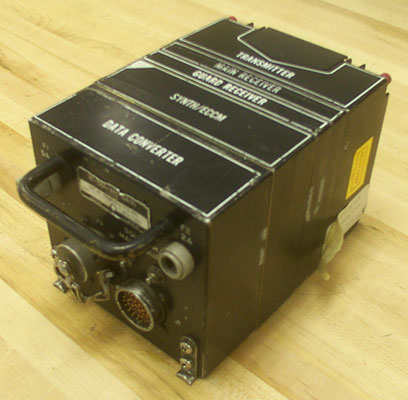
AN/ARC-164 (Receiver/Transmitter RT-1504) used for Aeronautical mobile (OR) service/HQ II

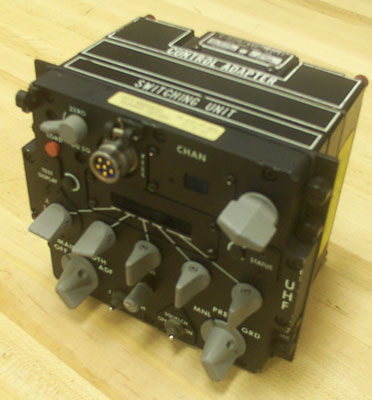
AN/ARC-164 (Control Panel, C-11719) used for Aeronautical mobile (OR) service/HQ II

== References / sources ==
- International Telecommunication Union (ITU)
