= Cipher device =

Cryptographic instrument

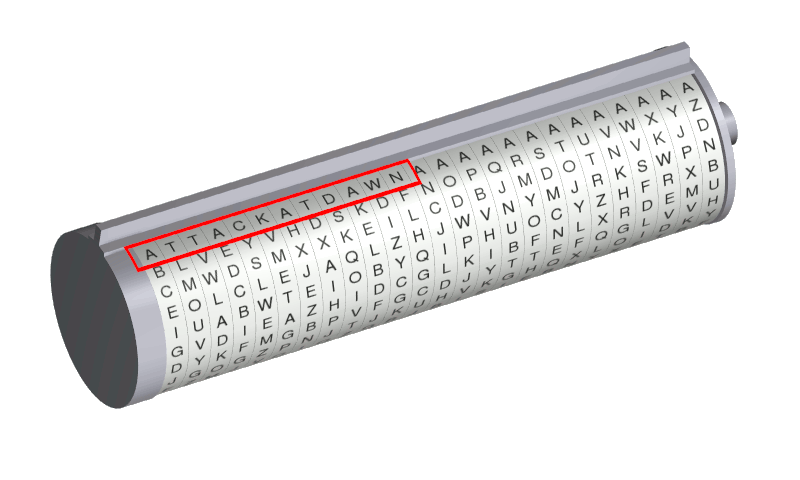
M-94 cipher device showing possible ciphertexts for the ATTACK AT DAWN plaintext

A cipher device was a term used by the US military in the first half of the 20th century to describe a manually operated cipher equipment that converted the plaintext into ciphertext or vice versa. A similar term, cipher machine, was used to describe the cipher equipment that required external power for operation. Cipher box or crypto box is a physical cryptographic device used to encrypt and decrypt messages between plaintext (unencrypted) and ciphertext (encrypted or secret) forms. The ciphertext is suitable for transmission over a channel, such as radio, that might be observed by an adversary the communicating parties wish to conceal the plaintext from.

== See also ==
- Cryptography

== Sources ==
- United States. Department of the Army (1969). Dictionary of United States Army Terms: (short Title: AD). Army regulation. Headquarters, Department of the Army.
