= Signal operating instructions =

U.S. military term

Signal operating instructions (SOI) or Communications-Electronics Operation Instructions (CEOI) are U.S. military terms for a type of combat order issued for the technical control and coordination of communications within a command. They include current and up-to-date information covering radio call signs and frequencies, a telephone directory, code-words (for rudimentary encryption), and visual and sound signals. A designated battalion signal officer prepares the battalion SOI in conformance with the SOI of higher headquarters. During operations, SOI are changed daily. Since the fielding of the SINCGARS system, however, the paper SOI has generally faded from Army use. Electronic SOI are now generated, distributed and loaded along with cryptographic keys.

The title SOI was used until the early 1970s and it was changed to CEOI and then changed back to SOI in the 1980s.
