= KYK-13 =

Fill device

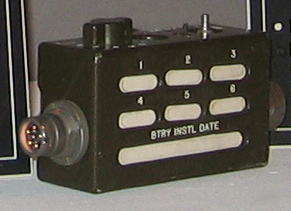
KYK-13 on display at the National Cryptologic Museum.

The KYK-13 Electronic Transfer Device is a common fill device designed by the United States National Security Agency for the transfer and loading of cryptographic keys with their corresponding check word. The KYK-13 is battery powered and uses the DS-102 protocol for key transfer. Its National Stock Number is 5810-01-026-9618.

Even though the KYK-13 was first introduced in 1976 and was supposed to have been made obsolete by the AN/CYZ-10 Data Transfer Device, it is still widely used because of its simplicity and reliability. A simpler device than the CYZ-10, the KIK-30 "Really Simple Key Loader" (RASKL) is now planned to replace the KYK-13, with up to $200 million budgeted to procure them in quantity.

== Components ==
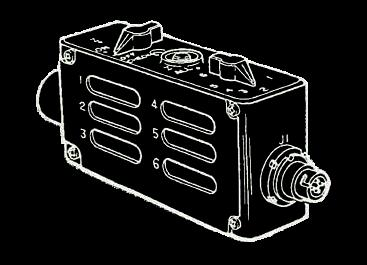
KYK-13

- P1 and J1 Connectors – electrically the same connection; used to connect to a fill cable, COMSEC device, KOI-18, KYX-15, another KYK-13, or AN/CYZ-10.
- Battery compartment – holds battery which powers KYK-13.
- Mode switch – three-position rotary switch used to select operation modes.
  - "Z" – used to zeroize selected keys.
  - ON – used to fill and transfer keys.
  - OFF CHECK – used to conduct parity checks.
- Parity Lamp – blinks when parity is checked or fill is transferred.
- Initiate push button – push this button when loading or zeroizing the KYK-13.
- Address select switch – seven-position rotary switch.
  - "Z" ALL – zeroizes all six storage registers when Mode Switch is set to "Z".
  - 1 through 6 – six storage registers for storing keys in KYK-13.
