= Have Quick =

Frequency-hopping system

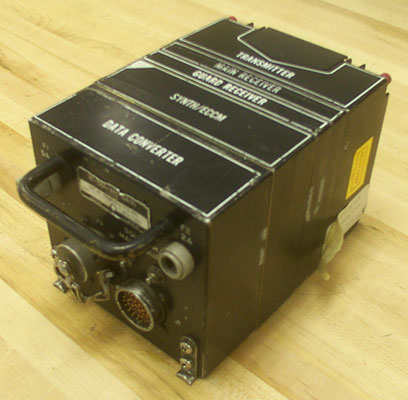
UHF-Aircraft station AN/ARC-164 HAVE QUICK II

Have Quick (also HAVEQUICK, short HQ) was an ECM-resistant frequency-hopping system used to protect military aeronautical mobile (OR) radio traffic.

Since the end of World War II, U.S. and Allied military aircraft have used AM radios in the NATO harmonised 225–400 MHz UHF band (part of NATO B band) for short range air-to-air and ground-to-air communications. During development and the procurement of UHF radios, military planners did not require features to secure communications for aircraft and helicopters from jamming until the post-Vietnam War era. Progress in electronics in the 1970s reached a point where anyone with an inexpensive radio frequency scanner or receiver set could intercept military communications. Once the target frequencies were identified, radio frequency jamming could easily be employed to degrade or completely disable communications.

The Have Quick program was a response to this problem. Engineers recognized that newer aircraft radios already included all-channel frequency synthesizers along with keyboards and displays for data entry. The only other system requirements to achieve the desired anti-jam functionality were an accurate clock (for timed synchronization) and a microprocessor to add frequency hopping to existing radios.

Aircraft and ground radios that employed HAVE QUICK needed be initialized with accurate time of day (TOD; usually from a GPS receiver), a word of the day (WOD), and a net identifier (providing mode selection and multiple networks to use the same word of the day). A word of the day is a transmission security variable that consists of six segments of six digits each. The word of the day was loaded into the radio or its control unit to key the HAVE QUICK system to the proper hopping pattern, rate, and dwell time. The word of the day, time of day and net identifier are input to a cryptographic pseudorandom number generator that controls the frequency changes.

HAVE QUICK is not an encryption system, though many HAVE QUICK radios can be used with encryption; e.g. the KY-58 VINSON system. HAVE QUICK is not compatible with SINCGARS, the VHF - FM radios used by ground forces, which operate in a different radio band and use a different frequency hopping method; however some newer radios support both.

== Particularities ==
- A national Air Force operates generally in a closed common user group. However, deviation to this regulation existed on German territory until 1990. E.g. the HQ-user of the German Air Force in the North of Germany, operational subordinated to 2nd Allied Tactical Air Force used HQ net-group 1, whereas the southern units, subordinated to 4th Allied Tactical Air Force, used HQ net-group 2.
- The co-ordination of HQ radio frequency channels in the NATO-harmonised UHF-band, the design of the so-called HQ hop-sets, is provided in NATO-Europe in responsibility of the NATO Allied Radio Frequency Agency (ARFA) in Brussels.
- For training and exercises, HQ operates in peacetime mode with limited frequency access. Four net-numbers may be used overlapping in net-group 1 and 2. However, in tactical operation mode this limitation might be lifted.
- Some HQ-features are compatible to encryption hardware; e.g. to the KY-58 VINSON-family.

== Utilization in the US and NATO ==
HAVE QUICK was well adopted, and by 2007 was used on nearly all U.S. military and NATO aircraft. Improvements included HAVE QUICK II Phase 2. By 2022 the "Second generation Anti-Jam Tactical UHF Radio for NATO" called SATURN had replaced it in all NATO and Allied nations.

== See also ==
- AN/PRC-152
- AN/ARC-164
- AN/PRC-117F
- AN/ARC-182
- AN/ARC-210
- B band (NATO)
- Combat-net radio
- Spread spectrum
