= Repair (disambiguation) =

Repair refers to corrective maintenance to fix or mend something which is damaged or broken.

Repair may also refer to:

- "Repair" (Westlife song), from 2019 album Spectrum
- "Repairs" (Agents of S.H.I.E.L.D.), 2013 television episode

== See also ==
- Corrective maintenance § See also
- Repair shop (disambiguation)
- Fix (disambiguation)
- Maintenance (disambiguation)
- MEND (disambigaution)
