= AN/UYK-43 =

32-bit military computer

The AN/UYK-43 was the standard 32-bit computer of the United States Navy for surface ship and submarine platforms, with the first unit delivered in October, 1984. Some 1,250 units were delivered through to 2000. The size of a refrigerator, it replaced the older AN/UYK-7, both built by UNISYS and shared the same instruction set. An enhancement to the UYK-43, the Open Systems Module (OSM), allows up to six VMEbus Type 6U commercial off-the-shelf (COTS) cards to be installed in a UYK-43 enclosure.

In accordance with the Joint Electronics Type Designation System (JETDS), the "AN/UYK-43" designation represents the 43rd design of an Army-Navy electronic device for general utility data processing computing equipment. The JETDS system also now is used to name all Department of Defense electronic systems.

The UYK-43 is being replaced by commercial off-the-shelf systems. Retired systems are being cannibalized for repair parts to support systems still in use by U.S. and non-U.S. forces.

== Architecture ==
The historic AN/UYK-43 architecture includes active redundancy. It includes multiple processors, multiple memory banks, and multiple input-output devices with interfaces for multiple disk drives. Power-on self test firmware incorporates features that reconfigure software loading in order to bypass failure. This allows it to run in degraded mode with failed processors, failed memory, failed disk drives, and failed input/output devices. Remote status boards perform fault reporting.

These features improve combat survivability and eliminate requirements for periodic diagnostic maintenance, which is the intent of condition-based maintenance.

The standardized computer programming language associated with UYK and AYK series computers is called CMS-2 developed by Rand Corporation.

== See also ==
- AN/UYK-44 16-bit computer
- CMS-2 (programming language)
- Military computers
- List of military electronics of the United States
