= Maintain (disambiguation) =

Maintain involves functional checks and servicing.

Maintain may also refer to:

- Maintainability, the ease in engineering
- Olu Maintain, a Nigerian artist
- "Maintain" (song), a 2018 song by Belly

== See also ==
- Maintenance (disambiguation)
