= VDM =

VDM may refer to:

- VDM Metals, a producer of nickel alloys and stainless steels
  - formerly known as Vereinigte Deutsche Metallwerke, a manufacturer of aircraft propeller systems
- VDM Publishing, a publishing group specializing in publishing German, French and English theses and dissertations
- Van der Moolen N.V., a Dutch trading company
- Verbi dei minister, an informal designation as a Christian minister
- VeryDarkMan, a Nigerian social media influencer
- Vienna Development Method, a formal software development method
- Value driven maintenance, industrial maintenance management methodology.
- Virtual DOS machine
- Vulnerability Discovery Model, used to estimate future vulnerability discovery process/trend
