= Maintenance (disambiguation) =

Maintenance refers to functional checks, servicing, repairing or overhaul to preserve or restore function to devices, equipment, buildings, or infrastructure

Maintenance may also refer to:

== Biological science ==
- Maintenance respiration

== Non-technical maintenance ==
- Alimony, also called maintenance in British English
- Champerty and maintenance, two related legal doctrines
- Child support, also commonly called "child maintenance"
- Feudal maintenance, system of funding armies

== Technical maintenance ==
- Aircraft maintenance
- Bicycle maintenance
- Bus maintenance
- Car maintenance
- Train maintenance
- Property maintenance
- Railroad track maintenance
- Software maintenance

=== Some kinds of technical maintenance ===
- Condition-based maintenance
- Corrective maintenance
- Planned maintenance
- Predictive maintenance
- Preventive maintenance
- Total productive maintenance
