= Clandestine operation =

Coordinated actions undertaken by a group that are to be kept secret from the public

A clandestine operation is an intelligence or military operation carried out in such a way that the operation goes unnoticed by the general population or specific enemy forces.

== Analysis ==
Until the 1970s, clandestine operations were primarily political in nature, generally aimed at assisting groups or nations favored by the sponsor. Examples include U.S. intelligence involvement with German and Japanese war criminals after World War II or the botched Bay of Pigs Invasion in 1961. Today these operations are numerous and include technology-related clandestine operations.

The bulk of clandestine operations are related to the gathering of intelligence, typically by both people (clandestine human intelligence) and by hidden sensors. Placement of underwater or land-based communications cable taps, cameras, microphones, traffic sensors, monitors such as sniffers, and similar systems require that the mission go undetected and unsuspected. Clandestine sensors may also be on unmanned underwater vehicles, reconnaissance (spy) satellites (such as Misty), low-observability unmanned aerial vehicles (UAV), or unmanned detectors (as in Operation Igloo White and its successors), or hand-placed by clandestine human operations.

The United States Department of Defense Dictionary of Military and Associated Terms (Joint Publication JP 1-02, dated 8 November 2010, Amended Through 15 February 2016) defines "clandestine", "clandestine intelligence collection", and "clandestine operation" as

clandestine — Any activity or operation sponsored or conducted by governmental departments or agencies with the intent to assure secrecy and concealment. (JP 2-01.2)

clandestine intelligence collection — The acquisition of protected intelligence information in a way designed to conceal the nature of the operation and protect the source. (JP 2-01.2)

clandestine operation — An operation sponsored or conducted by governmental departments or agencies in such a way as to assure secrecy or concealment. See also covert operation; overt operation. (JP 3-05)

The DOD Dictionary of Military and Associated Terms (January 2021) defines "clandestine" and "clandestine operation" the same way.

The terms clandestine and covert are not synonymous. As noted in the definition (which has been used by the United States and NATO since World War II) in a covert operation the identity of the sponsor is concealed, while in a clandestine operation the operation itself is concealed. Put differently, clandestine means "hidden", where the aim is for the operation to not be noticed at all. Covert means "deniable", such that if the operation is noticed, it is not attributed to a group. The term stealth refers both to a broad set of tactics aimed at providing and preserving the element of surprise and reducing enemy resistance. It can also be used to describe a set of technologies (stealth technology) to aid in those tactics. While secrecy and stealthiness are often desired in clandestine and covert operations, the terms secret and stealthy are not used to formally describe types of missions. Some operations may have both clandestine and covert aspects, such as the use of concealed remote sensors or human observers to direct artillery attacks and airstrikes. The attack is obviously overt (coming under attack alerts the target that he has been located by the enemy), but the targeting component (the exact method that was used to locate targets) can remain clandestine.

In World War II, targets found through cryptanalysis of radio communication were attacked only if there had been aerial reconnaissance in the area, or, in the case of the shootdown of Admiral Isoroku Yamamoto, where the sighting could be attributed to the Coastwatchers. During the Vietnam War, trucks attacked on the Ho Chi Minh trail were completely unaware of some sensors, such as the airborne Black Crow device that sensed their ignition. They could also have been spotted by a clandestine human patrol. Harassing and interdiction (H&I) or free-fire zone rules can also cause a target to be hit for purely random reasons.

== See also ==
- Covert operation
- Fifth column
- Special Activities Center
- Plausible deniability
