= LuxConnect =

Luxembourgish data centre provider

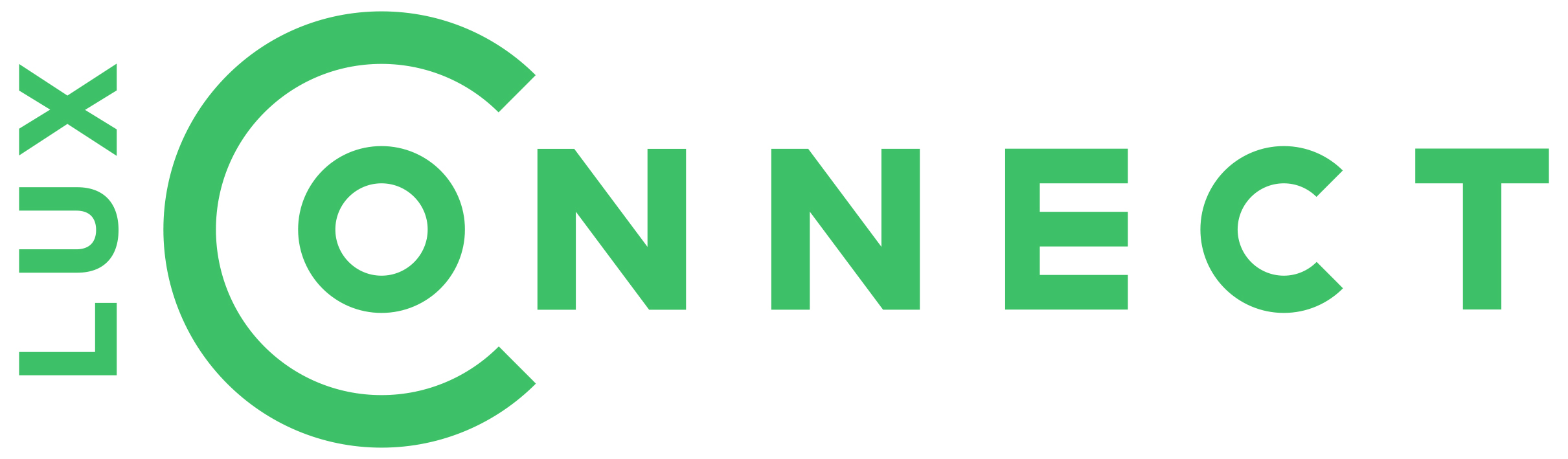
LuxConnect

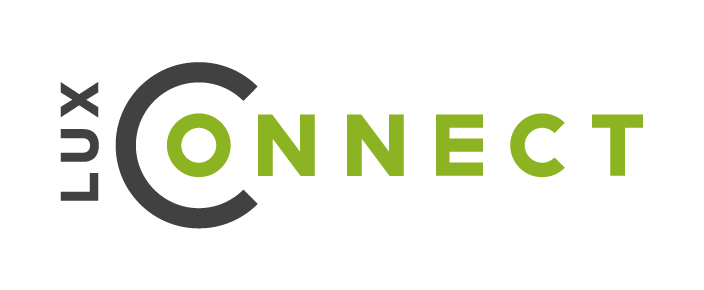
- Type: Corporation (Société Anonyme)
- Industry: Dark fiber, Data center, HPC and Cloud solutions
- Founded: 2006
- Headquarters: Bettembourg, Luxembourg
- Key people: Jacques Thill (Chairman of the board of directors); Paul Konsbruck (CEO); Vincent Weynandt (CTO)
- Number of employees: 27
- Website: www.luxconnect.lu

LuxConnect is a private company created under the initiative of the Luxembourg government in 2006. Its primary objectives are :

- the improvement of the national dark fiber network;
- the building and operation of state of the art data centers.

== History ==
The company's key dates are:

- October 2006: Incorporation of LuxConnect S.A. by the State of Luxembourg as main shareholder.
- June 2009: The first data center (DC1.1) on the Bettembourg ICT campus is operational
- January 2011: The second data center (DC1.2) on the Bettembourg ICT campus is operational
- April 2012: The first data center (DC2) on the Bissen ICT campus is operational
- March 2016: Completion of the implementation of 1000 km optical cables within the country of Luxembourg
- Mid-2015: The third data center (DC1.3) on the Bettembourg ICT campus is operational

== Product Portfolio ==
=== Dark fiber ===
LuxConnect owns and operates an optical fiber network consisting of more than 1.800 km of optical fiber cables across Luxembourg to redundantly connect all commercial data centers.

=== Data centers ===
LuxConnect currently operates four carrier neutral data centers across the country, providing 15.000 m^{2} of net server space.
Three of these data centers are located in Bettembourg and one is in Bissen.

The data centers of LuxConnect are certified by the Uptime Institute:

- Data Center DC1.1 Tier IV Design certified in July 2013.
- Data Center DC1.2 Tier IV Design certified
- Data Center DC2 Tier IV and Tier II Design certified in March 2014.
- Data Center DC1.3 Tier IV and Tier II Design certified in May 2014.

LuxConnect operates the first green datacenter in Luxembourg, where the cooling is achieved by means of an absorption refrigerator using waste heat from a cogeneration plant.

=== HPC ===
LuxProvide S.A., as a 100% subsidiary of LuxConnect, is in charge of the acquisition, launch and operation of MeluXina, the supercomputer installed in LuxConnect's Data Center DC2 in Bissen.

=== Cloud ===
Clarence is the result of a partnership between LuxConnect and Proximus. This joint venture's goal is to create a disconnected sovereign cloud, designed to retain control over the integrity of data and access to it, but also, from an operational point of view, to ensure that all operations are realized on European soil and subject only to European jurisdictions.
