= Panthalassa (disambiguation) =

Panthalassa was the prehistoric superocean that surrounded Pangaea

Panthalassa may also refer to:

- Panthalassa (horse), Japanese thoroughbred racehorse
- Panthalassa: The Music of Miles Davis 1969–1974
- Panthalassa: The Remixes, 1999 remix album
- Panthalassa (company), American wave energy startup
