= Data center tiers =

Defined levels of resiliency and redundancy for IT infrastructure

Data center tiers are defined levels of resiliency and redundancy for IT facility infrastructure. They are widely used in the data center, ISP and cloud computing industries as a framework for designing and classifying high availability systems. The tier classification system was created by the Uptime Institute.

The four tiers define increasing levels of redundancy in power supply, cooling and other critical infrastructure components. Higher tiers require that the facility remain operational — at the level of the tier below — even during maintenance or single component failures.

- Tier I: no redundancy. A single path for power and cooling, no redundant components.
- Tier II: partial N+1 redundancy for power and cooling components, but still a single distribution path.
- Tier III: full N+1 redundancy of all systems, including power supply and cooling distribution paths. Maintenance can be performed without taking the facility offline.
- Tier IV: 2N+1 redundancy of all systems. The facility can sustain any single failure without impacting the load. All cooling and power distribution paths are fully redundant and independently active.

Most commercial data centers are certified to Tier III. Rather than building Tier IV facilities, many large cloud service providers instead use multiple availability zones to distribute their services geographically, achieving resilience across multiple physical sites.

Data center tier classification
Tier	Uptime guarantee per year	Downtime per year	Redundancy
Tier 1	99.671%	<28.8 hours	None
Tier 2	99.741%	<22 hours	Partial power and cooling (partial N+1)
Tier 3	99.982%	<1.6 hours	Full N+1
Tier 4	99.995%	<26.3 minutes	Fault tolerant (2N or 2N+1)

== See also ==
- Availability zone
- Data center
- High availability
- Redundancy (engineering)
- Uptime Institute
- Failure domain
