= Advanced automation functions =

Class of software for automated machinery control

In automation production technology the actions performed by an automated process are executed by a program of instructions which is run during a work cycle. To execute work cycle programs, an automated system should be available to execute these advanced functions.

== Safety monitoring ==
If there is a need for workers in an automated system, a safety monitoring is required for the occupational safety and health of the workers. In a safety monitoring various steps can take place including a complete stop of the system, sounding an alarm or reducing the operating speed. Usually, limiting switches are sensors like temperature probes, heat and smoke detectors or pressure sensitive floor pads.

== Maintenance and repair diagnostics ==
There are three modes of operations which are used in a cycle of maintenance and repair diagnostics: status monitoring, failure diagnostics and recommendation of the repair procedure. In the status monitoring mode, the current system status is displayed. The failure diagnostics mode takes place when a failure occurs. The system will then suggest an adequate repair procedure to a team of experts.

== Error detection and recovery ==
The error detection mode is a step to determine if and when a failure occurs in automated system. The possible errors can be divided into three categories. random errors, systematic errors and aberrations. While in the error recovery mode, remedy actions take place for all detected errors.
