= Operational availability =

Measurement of the actual versus predicted uptime of a system

Operational availability in systems engineering is a measurement of how long a system has been available to use when compared with how long it should have been available to be used.

== Definition ==
Operational availability is a management concept that evaluates the following.

- Diagnostic down time
- Criticality
- Fault isolation down time
- Logistics delay down time
- Corrective maintenance down time

Any failed item that is not corrected will induce operational failure. $A_o$ is used to evaluate that risk. Operational failure is unacceptable in any situation where the following can occur.

- Capital equipment loss
- Injury or loss of life
- Sustained failure to accomplish mission

In military acquisition, operational availability is used as one of the Key Performance Parameters in requirements documents, to form the basis for decision support analyses.

== History ==
Aircraft systems, ship systems, missile systems, and space systems have a large number of failure modes that must be addressed with limited resources.

Formal reliability modeling during development is required to prioritize resource allocation before operation begins. Estimated failure rates and logistics delay are used to identify the number of forward positioned spare parts required to avoid excessive down time. This is also used to justify the expense associated with redundancy.

Formal availability measurement is used during operation to prioritize management decisions involving upgrade resource allocation, manpower allocation, and spare parts planning.

== Principle ==
Operational availability is used to evaluate the following performance characteristic.

For a system that is expected to be available constantly, the below operational availability figures translate to the system being unavailable for approximately the following lengths of time (when all outages during a year are added together):

$$A_o = 0.9 \approx 877 \ hours \ down \ time \ per \ year$$
$$A_o = 0.99 \approx 87 \ hours \ down \ time \ per \ year$$
$$A_o = 0.999 \approx 8 \ hours \ down \ time \ per \ year$$
$$A_o = 0.9999 \approx 52 \ minutes \ down \ time \ per \ year$$
$$A_o = 0.99999 \approx 5 \ minutes \ down \ time \ per \ year$$

The following data is collected for maintenance actions while in operation to prioritize corrective funding.

- Diagnostic down time is required to identify the amount of time spent performing maintenance when fault reporting does not support condition-based maintenance.
- Criticality identifies level of risk associated with loss of mission, injury or loss of life, and capital equipment.
- Fault isolation down time is required to identify the amount of time spent locating a failure.
- Logistics delay down time is required to identify the amount of time required to obtain replacement parts or software.
- Corrective maintenance down time is required to identify the amount of time required to install and reconfigure replacement parts and software.

This data is applied to the reliability block diagram to evaluate individual availability reduction contributions using the following formulas.

$$A_{o}^{D} = \left( \frac{ Total \ Time }{Total \ Time + Diagnostic \ Down \ Time } \right)$$

$$A_{o}^{FI} = \left( \frac{ Total \ Time }{Total \ Time + Fault \ Isolation \ Down \ Time } \right)$$

$$A_{o}^{L} = \left( \frac{ Total \ Time }{Total \ Time + Logistics \ Down \ Time } \right)$$

$$A_{o}^{C} = \left( \frac{ Total \ Time }{Total \ Time + Corrective \ Down \ Time } \right)$$

Redundant items do not contribute to availability reduction unless all of the redundant components fail simultaneously.

Operational availability is the overall availability considering each of these contributions.

$$A_o = A_{o}^{D} \times A_{o}^{FI} \times A_{o}^{L} \times A_{o}^{C}$$

== See also ==
- Active redundancy
- Availability
- Downtime
- Reliability block diagram
