= Operational maintenance =

Basic maintenance done by operators of the equipment

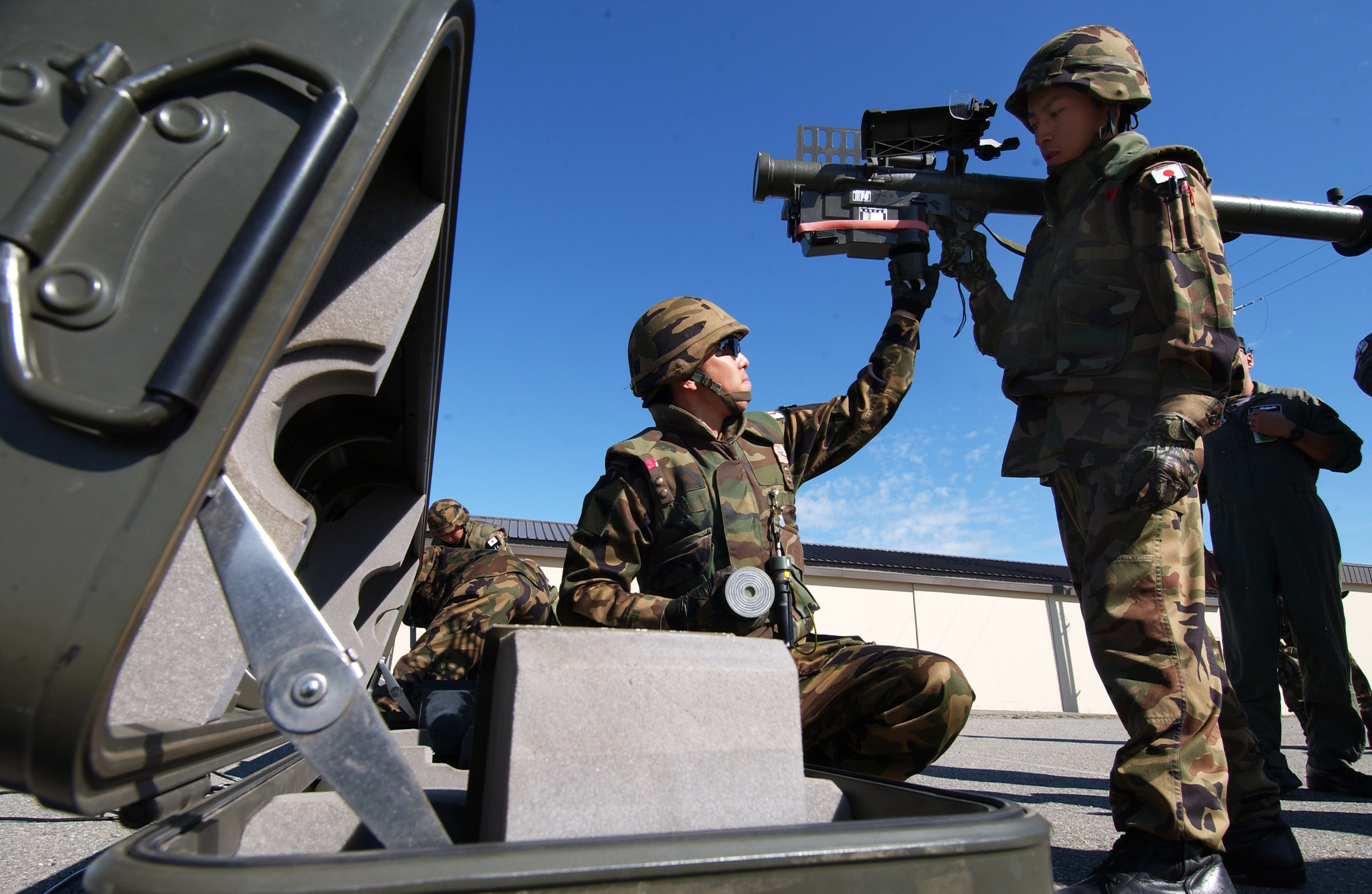
JASDF soldiers conduct operational maintenance on a Type 91 MANPAD by making a change to its battery pack during Red Flag - Alaska.

Operational maintenance is the care and minor maintenance of equipment using procedures that do not require detailed technical knowledge of the equipment’s or system’s function and design. This category of operational maintenance normally consists of inspecting, cleaning, servicing, preserving, lubricating, and adjusting, as required. Such maintenance may also include minor parts replacement that does not require the person performing the work to have highly technical skills or to perform internal alignment.

== Purpose ==
As the term implies, operational maintenance, is performed by the operator of the equipment. Its purpose is threefold: (1) to make the operator aware of the state of readiness of the equipment; (2) to reduce the delays that would occur if a qualified technician had to be called every time a simple adjustment were needed; and (3) to release technicians for more complicated work.

== Settings and examples ==
This form of preventative maintenance can be performed in any setting where machines, equipment, or vehicles are used. This may include manufacturing plants and factories, as well as automotive shops. In many commercial buildings, heating and cooling engineers perform operational maintenance tasks on furnaces, boilers, and air conditioners.

Some operational maintenance responsibilities can be as simple as inspecting the machine to spot any changes or issues. This allows the operator to detect a potential danger, such as loose fasteners or debris that could contribute to an accident. Basic cleaning, including removing debris or excess grease from a machine, is also considered part of operational maintenance.

Depending on the type of equipment in use, operators may also be responsible for replacing worn out filters or cartridges, or removing and replacing a worn belt, cutting tool, or grinding stone. Operational maintenance may entail keeping machinery well lubricated to reduce the risk of friction or failure. Many basic machine adjustments needed during the course of operation also fall within this category of preventative maintenance.

== See also ==
- Corrective maintenance
- Preventive maintenance
- Care and maintenance

== Sources ==
- T-Pub Integrated Publishing
