= Yankee Group =

American information technology and market research advisory firm

- Industry: Telecommunications and information technology market research
- Founded: 1970
- Fate: Acquired by 451 Research in 2013
- Headquarters: Boston, Massachusetts
- Website: https://www.yankeegroup.com/

Yankee Group was an independent technology research and consulting firm, founded in 1970 by Howard Anderson. The firm "was one of the analyst industry’s most prestigious boutiques through the dot.com boom, with 70 analysts on the payroll in 2006."

In 1996, Yankee was sold to Primark, then to Reuters in 2000 for $72.5 million. In May 2004, Yankee was bought by Decision Matrix Group for around $30 million. The firm was acquired by 451 Research on January 3, 2013.
