= Value-driven maintenance =

Value-driven maintenance (VDM) is a maintenance management methodology.

== History ==
VDM was developed by Mark Haarman and Guy Delahay, both former chairmen of the Dutch Maintenance Association (NVDO) in their book entitled Value Driven Maintenance, New Faith in Maintenance published by Mainnovation in 2004.

== Value drivers in maintenance ==
In financial literature, value (net present value) is defined as the sum of all free future cash flows, discounted to the present date.

A cash flow is the difference between income and expenditure. It is not the difference between turnover and costs, because this is easy to manipulate through accounting. Some companies may use creative lease, depreciation and reservation techniques to keep book profits artificially high or low; this does not always contribute to shareholder value. Recent stock market scandals are an example of what may happen as a result of this. The second part of the definition concerns the knowledge that the value of a cash flow is time-related, given the term "present value". Future cash flows must be corrected or discounted to today. Managing by value necessitates maximizing future cash flows. Managing by value obliges companies to search for new free cash flows. It's no longer enough for a company to go on doing what it is already doing.

Once the concept of value is understood, this concept can be translated into maintenance. Within VDM, there are four axes along which maintenance can contribute to value creation within a company. The axes are also called the four value drivers.

=== Asset utilization ===
The first value driver, asset utilization seeks to increase the technical availability of a technical equipment. With higher technical availability, it is possible to produce and sell more products with the same invested capital, generating more income while the fixed costs remain the same. In other words, the free cash flows increase, which automatically means value creation. Maintenance can increase technical availability by preventing unwanted breakdowns, scheduling plant maintenance in a smarter way and performing repairs and inspections faster. A point to note is that higher technical availability produces value not only in growth markets. In markets where demand is stable or declining, greater availability can also create value. By making a plant more efficient, the number of shifts can be reduced or it may even be possible to close down sister plants. At corporate level, this does not generate more turnover, but it does significantly reduce costs, which is another way of creating value.

=== Safety, health, and environment ===
An increasingly important value driver for maintenance is safety, health, and environment (SHE) in VDM terminology. Compliance with legal directives covering SHE creates value in two ways. Firstly, it avoids the imposition of government penalties for breaches of legislation. Secondly, a good SHE policy has a positive effect on retention of the License to Operate. This is something else that has value, because it increases the likelihood of future cash flows actually materializing. Without a License to Operate, there will be no future cash flows and thus no value. Problem here is that it does not take the other error type into account (related to a lower false safety trip rate, but higher accident rate). It is very controversial to put a value on human life and therefore this VDM theory is just like the ALARP logic dangerous to use and might not be accepted by all legislation world-wide (specially in the US).

The importance of the SHE value driver becomes apparent when looking at the recent incident with the BP Oil Spill in the Gulf of Mexico; the Deepwater Horizon oil spill. Poor maintenance is believed to be the cause of one of the biggest oil spills in history, causing massive damage to the environment. Total accumulated consequence costs (both clean-up costs and loss of company value) are estimated on 12 billion.

=== Cost control ===
Even though maintenance is not a cost center in itself, it does consume significant quantities of money. The maintenance budget consists mainly of wage and training costs of technicians, managers and indirect personnel, the costs of spare parts and tools and the costs of contracted personnel and outsourced work. Savings on the maintenance budget automatically generate free cash flows in the future and, by consequence, value. The savings are achievable by having a smarter Preventive maintenance program, higher technician productivity, lower procurement prices for materials and services and the right ratio of the number of technicians, managers and indirect personnel. Controlling maintenance costs is called "Cost Control" in VDM.

=== Resource allocation ===
Finally, maintenance can create value through the smarter management of resources. This is called "Resource Allocation" in VDM. It is not about the consumption of resources, because that is already covered in the Cost Control value driver. Within VDM, a distinction is made between four types of resources: technicians, spare parts, contractors and knowledge. One need to think only of cash flows freed up as a result of smarter management or savings on warehouses, logistical employees, insurance and the avoidance of obsolete and surplus spare parts. In practise, it often turns out that the value potential of smart management of spare parts by far exceeds the value potential of the other resources.

A natural tension exists between the four value drivers. The theory states that a maintenance manager should be continually searching for the right balance between these value drivers. It is important to know how they compare. One can determine this instinctively but many corporate managers require a financial validation because, for example, it will be a decisive factor in investment decisions or because stakeholders (e.g. financial manager, production manager) are not prepared to accept a judgement based on instinct. This is a situation where one should use the VDM formula.

== Formula ==
The VDM formula is derived from the net present value formula and can be used to calculate the value of maintenance. The VDM formula is:

PV_{maintenance} = Σ {F_{SHE,t} x (CF_{AU,t} + CF_{CC,t} + CF_{RA,t} + CF_{SHE,t}) / (1+r)^{t}}

where:

PV_{maintenance} = present value potential of maintenance

F_{SHE,t} = SHE factor in year t

CF_{AU,t} = future free cash flow in year t from Asset Utilization

CF_{CC,t} = future free cash flow in year t from Cost Control

CF_{RA,t} = future free cash flow in year t from Resource Allocation

CF_{SHE,t} = future free cash flow in year t from Safety, Health & Environment

r = Discount rate

SHE stands out prominently in the formula. This factor shows how great the probability is that the License to Operate will be retained in the coming years and that the expected cash flows from all four value drivers will actually be attainable in the future. Consequently, the SHE factor is a probability factor with a value of 0 to 1. A SHE factor of 0 means 0% probability of retention of the License to Operate, for example in a fictitious case where a company decides to stop performing all maintenance for cost reasons. The free cash flow that this creates on Cost Control will be enormous. But because the company fails to satisfy SHE laws and this loses its License to Operate, this cash flow will not create any value. The VDM model can be simplified in certain situations. Assume that we work with Perpetuity. This means there will be indefinitely be a free cash flow that is the same year after year and the SHE factor is constant; the VDM formula thus becomes:

PV_{maintenance} = F_{SHE,t} x (CF_{AU,t} + CF_{CC,t} + CF_{RA,t} + CF_{SHE,t}) / r

== See also ==
- Condition Based Maintenance
- Corrective maintenance
- Planned maintenance
- Reliability Centered Maintenance
