= Root Cause Analysis Solver Engine =

Root Cause Analysis Solver Engine (RCASE)
- Class: Information science
- Data structure: inaccurate, incomplete and erroneous data

Root Cause Analysis Solver Engine (informally RCASE) is a proprietary algorithm developed from research originally at the Warwick Manufacturing Group (WMG) at Warwick University. RCASE development commenced in 2003 to provide an automated version of root cause analysis, the method of problem solving that tries to identify the root causes of faults or problems. RCASE is now owned by the spin-out company Warwick Analytics where it is being applied to automated predictive analytics software.

== Algorithm ==
The algorithm has been built from the ground up to be particularly suitable for the following situations:

- 'dirty' data
- incomplete data
- big data
- small datasets
- complex problems for example multi-modal failure or with more than one solution

RCASE is considered to be an innovator in the field of Predictive analytics and falls within the category of classification algorithms. Because it was built to handle the data types above, it has been proven to have many advantages over other types of classification algorithms and machine learning algorithms such as decision trees, neural networks and regression techniques. It does not require hypotheses.

It has since been commercialised and made available for operating systems such as SAP, Teradata and Microsoft. RCASE originated from manufacturing and is widely used in applications such as Six Sigma, quality control and engineering, product design and warranty issues. However it is also used in other industries such as e-commerce, financial services and utilities where root cause analysis is required.

== Mechanism & architecture ==
RCASE is non-statistical and thus does not require any hypotheses. If the key parameters causing the issue or fault in a process are not present in a dataset, it will still narrow the search space and advise where the root cause may lie. This is a different approach to statistical theories which try to find a best fit.

RCASE is based on optimised combinatorial theory and runs on either a grid cluster or a high performance in-memory database. The software will interface with all MES and ERP systems. The result is a security system monitoring and preventing defective products from being produced. The output from the analysis will be markers that identify either an exact root cause of failure or a parametric region pointing high probability of failure (i.e. data-driven guidance on where to look next to gather data and resolve the root cause exactly).

The software can be installed on Linux or Microsoft operating systems and deployed as On-Premises or Software-as-a-Service (“SaaS” or “cloud”).

== See also ==
- Predictive maintenance
