= AverStar =

Software company in Cambridge, Massachusetts (founded as Intermetrics 1969)

AverStar (formerly Intermetrics, Inc.) was a software company founded in Cambridge, Massachusetts in 1969 by several veterans of M.I.T.'s Instrumentation Laboratory who had worked on the software for NASA's Apollo Program including the Apollo Guidance Computer.

The company specialized in compiler technology. It was responsible for the design and implementation of the HAL/S programming language, used to write the Space Shuttle PASS (Primary Avionics Software System). It participated in the design effort leading to the Ada programming language, designed the Red language, one of the finalists in the design competition, and wrote one of the first production-quality Ada compilers. The large-scale Ada 95 revision of the language was designed at Intermetrics.. Intermetrics also developed the CS-4 programming language for the United States Navy in the 1970s as a "language extension" to CMS-2 and as "a translator for existing CMS-2 programs".

Intermetrics merged with Whitesmiths Ltd. in December 1988. In 1997, Intermetrics merged with computer game developer Looking Glass Studios . In 1998, Intermetrics acquired Pacer Infotec, and changed its name to 'AverStar'. AverStar merged with the Titan Corporation in March, 2000; Titan was acquired by L-3 Communications in 2005.
