= CS-4 (programming language) =

- Designed by: Intermetrics, Inc.
- Developer: Intermetrics
- First appeared: 26 December 1973; 52 years ago
- Typing discipline: unknown

Influenced by
- unknown

Influenced
- Praxis

CS-4 is a programming language and an operating system interface. It was developed in the early 1970s at Intermetrics in Cambridge, Massachusetts. The first published manual was released in December 1973, entitled "CS-4 Language Reference Manual and Operating System Interface". The document had three parts: CS-4 Base Language Capabilities; CS-4 Operating System Interface; and Overview of Full CS-4 Capabilities.

== History ==
The CS-4 language, was developed for the United States Navy in the 1970s as a "language extension" to CMS-2 and as "a translator for existing CMS-2 programs". It was an ongoing research project, which was continuing the study of extensibility and abstraction techniques to develop a requirement of the language to be simple and compact. The language was first documented in 1973 by Miller et al., and was revised in 1975 to allow "data abstractions and more powerful extension facilities".

== Descendants ==
- Praxis explicitly refers to CS-4 as a predecessor language.
