= Fault reporting =

Maintenance concept

Fault reporting is a maintenance concept that increases operational availability and that reduces operating cost by three mechanisms:

- Reduce labor-intensive diagnostic evaluation
- Eliminate diagnostic testing down-time
- Provide notification to management for degraded operation

That is a prerequisite for condition-based maintenance.

Active redundancy can be integrated with fault reporting to reduce the down time to a few minutes per year.

== History ==
Formal maintenance philosophies are required by organizations whose primary responsibility is to ensure systems are ready when expected, such as space agencies and military.

Labor-intensive planned maintenance began during the rise of the Industrial Revolution and depends upon periodic diagnostic evaluation based upon calendar dates, distance, or use. The intent is to accomplish diagnostic evaluations that indicate when maintenance is required to prevent inconvenience and safety issues that will occur when critical equipment failures occur during use.

The electronic revolution allowed inexpensive sensors and controls to be integrated into most equipment. That includes diagnostic indicators, fluid sensors, temperature sensors, ignition sensors, exhaust monitoring, voltage sensors, and similar monitoring equipment that indicates when maintenance is required. Sensor displays are often located in inaccessible locations that cannot be observed during normal operation. Labor-intensive periodic maintenance is often required to inspect indicators.

Some organizations have eliminated most labor-intensive periodic maintenance and diagnostic down time by implementing designs that bring all sensor status to fault indicators near users.

== Principle ==
Maintenance requires three actions.

- Fault discovery
- Fault isolation
- Fault recovery

Fault discovery requires diagnostic maintenance, which requires system down time and labor costs.

Down time and cost requirements associated with diagnostics are eliminated for every item that satisfies the following criteria.

- Automated diagnostic
- Instrumented for remote viewing
- Displayed in the viscidity of supervisory personnel

== Implementation ==
Fault reporting is an optional feature that can be forwarded to remote displays using simple configuration setting in all modern computing equipment. The system level of reporting that is appropriate for Condition Based Maintenance are critical, alert, and emergency, which indicate software termination due to failure. Specific failure reporting, like interface failure, can be integrated into applications linked with these reporting systems. There is no development cost if they are incorporated into designs.

- Syslog
- Event Log
- Power distribution unit

Other kinds of fault reporting involves painting green, yellow, and red zones onto temperature gages, pressure gages, flow gages, vibration sensors, strain gages, and similar sensors. Remote viewing can be implemented using a video camera.

=== Benefits ===
The historical approach for Fault discovery is periodic diagnostic testing, which eliminates the following operational availability penalty.

$$Availability \ Reduction = \frac{ Total \ Time }{Total \ Time + Maintenance \ Down \ Time }$$

Fault reporting eliminates maintenance costs associated manual diagnostic testing.

$$Diagnostic \ Cost = Maintenance \ Down \ Time \times Labor \ Rate \times \ Team \ Size$$

Labor is eliminated in redundant designs by using the fault discovery and fault isolation functions to automatically reconfigure equipment for degraded operation.

Maintenance savings can be re-allocated to upgrades and improvements that increase organizational competitiveness.

=== Problems ===
Faults that do not trigger a sustained requirement for fault isolation and fault recovery actions should not be displayed for management action.

For example, lighting up a fault indicator in situations if human intervention is not required induces breakage by causing maintenance personnel to perform work when nothing is already broken.

Another example is that enabling fault reporting for Internet network packet delivery failure increases network loading when the network is already busy, which causes a total network outage.

== See also ==
- Active redundancy
- Operational availability
