= HAL/S =

Programming language

XPL
- Paradigm: Procedural, imperative, structured; real-time
- Designed by: Intermetrics
- First appeared: 1964; 62 years ago

HAL/S (High-order Assembly Language/Shuttle) is a real-time aerospace programming language compiler and cross-compiler for avionics applications used by NASA and associated agencies (JPL, etc.). It has been used in many U.S. space projects since 1973 and its most significant use was in the Space Shuttle program (approximately 85% of the Shuttle software was coded in HAL/S). It was designed by Intermetrics in 1972 for NASA and delivered in 1973. HAL/S is written in XPL, a dialect of PL/I. Although HAL/S is designed primarily for programming on-board computers, it is general enough to meet nearly all the needs in the production, verification, and support of aerospace and other real-time applications. According to documentation from 2005, it was being maintained by the HAL/S project of United Space Alliance.

== Goals and principles ==
The three key principles in designing the language were reliability, efficiency, and machine-independence. The language is designed to allow aerospace-related tasks (such as vector/matrix arithmetic) to be accomplished in a way that is easily understandable by people who have spaceflight knowledge, but may not necessarily have proficiency with computer programming.

HAL/S was designed not to include some constructs that were thought to be the cause of errors. For instance, there is no support for dynamic memory allocation. The language provides special support for real-time execution environments.

Some features, such as "GOTO" were provided chiefly to ease mechanical translations from other languages. (page 82)

"HAL" was suggested as the name of the new language by Ed Copps, a founding director of Intermetrics, to honor Hal Laning, a colleague at MIT. On the Preface page of the HAL/S Language Specification, it says,

fundamental contributions to the concept and implementation of MAC were made by Dr. J. Halcombe Laning of the Draper Laboratory.

A proposal for a NASA standard ground-based version of HAL named HAL/G for "ground" was proposed, but the coming emergence of the soon to be named Ada programming language contributed to Intermetrics' lack of interest in continuing this work. Instead, Intermetrics would place emphasis on what would be the "Red" finalist which would not be selected.

Host compiler systems have been implemented on an IBM 360/370, Data General Eclipse, and the Modcomp IV/Classic computers. Target computer systems have included IBM 360/370, IBM AP-101 (space shuttle avionics computer), Sperry 1819A/1819B, Data General Nova and Eclipse, CII Mitra 125, Modcomp II and IV, NASA Std. Spacecraft Computer-l and Computer-2, ITEK ATAC 16M (Galileo Project), and since 1978 the RCA CDP1802 COSMAC microprocessor (Galileo Project and others).

== Syntax ==
HAL/S is a mostly free-form language: statements may begin anywhere on a line and may spill over the next lines, and multiple statements may be fitted onto the same line if required. However, non-space characters in the first column of a program line may have special significance. For instance, the letter 'C' in the first column indicates that the whole line is a comment and should be ignored by the compiler.

One particularly interesting feature of HAL/S is that it supports, in addition to a normal single line text format, an optional three-line input format in which three source code lines are used for each statement. In this format, the first and third lines are usable for superscripts (exponents) and subscripts (indices). The multi-line format was designed to permit writing of HAL/S code that is similar to mathematical notation.

As an example, the statement $x = a^2 + b_i^2$ could be written in single-line format as:

X = A ** 2 + B$(I) ** 2 

Exponentiation is denoted by two asterisks, as in PL/I and Fortran. The subscript $i$ is denoted by a dollar sign, with the subscript expression enclosed in parentheses. The same code fragment could be written in multiple-line format as:

E       2     2
M  X = A  + B
S            I 

In the example, the base line of the statement is indicated by an 'M' in the first column, the exponent line is indicated by an 'E', and the subscript line is indicated by an 'S'.

== Example ==
The following is a simple HAL/S program. Every program begins with a labeled PROGRAM statement; the label consists of an identifier followed by a colon. All variables must be declared in the DECLARE group, which precedes any executable statements. Every program ends with a CLOSE delimiting statement.

   SIMPLE: PROGRAM;
C  CODE IN THIS TYPEFACE IS
C  HAL/S SOURCE
   DECLARE PI CONSTANT (3.14159266);
   DECLARE R SCALAR;
   READ(5) R;
   WRITE(6) PI R**2;
   CLOSE SIMPLE;

== Data types ==
HAL/S has native support for integers, floating point scalars, vector, matrices, booleans and strings of 8-bit characters, limited to a maximum length of 255. Structured types may be composed using a DECLARE STRUCT statement.

== See also ==
- Fortress, a programming language with advanced syntactic support for mathematical expressions
- IBM AP-101, the space shuttle avionics computer
