= Panthalassa (company) =

American wave energy startup

- Founded: 2016; 10 years ago in Portland, Oregon
- Headquarters: Oregon
- Key people: Garth Sheldon-Coulson (CEO)
- Website: https://panthalassa.com/

Panthalassa, is a US startup based in Portland, Oregon developing a deep water wave energy concept to power remote compute platforms. In May 2026, they announced $140m of Series B funding from a range of investors led by Peter Thiel.

Unlike other wave energy concepts, Panthalassa does not intend to transmit power to shore, which requires significant infrastructure and cost. Instead the power generated by the device will be used to power trained AI models. The seawater will also provide cooling for the computer chips, solving a second big problem. The company claim this will also reduce both land and grid constraints on building new data centers.

== Device concept ==
Panthalassa propose to deploy multiple devices called "nodes", primarily made from steel with few moving parts. The top of the device is a sphere containing sufficient air to provide buoyancy. Below this is a structure with a long tube in the centre extending below the waves. As the device moves up and down on the waves, water is forced up through this tube and drains back through turbines, generating electricity.

The electricity will be used to power AI chips, located in hermetically sealed containers below the sea surface, cooled by the ocean. User queries and responses will be transmitted to the nodes via the SpaceX Starlink communication system. The higher latency of Starlink versus fiber-optics might constrain Panthalassa to longer compute jobs, rather than the more popular uses of AI for chatbots and search assistants. A bigger constraint may be not being able to physically access the computer hardware to resolve issues, with power and networking being key considerations that are uniquely difficult to manage in remote environments with no staff according to the Uptime Institute.

The Panthalassa Ocean nodes are not moored, but have a self-contained propulsion and steering system, using the shape of the hull without an engine or requiring fuel. CEO and co-founder Garth Sheldon-Coulson described the device as "like a little Roomba, except it's enormous".

The company previously planned to generate hydrogen from multiple nodes in the open ocean.

== History ==
The company was founded in 2016, and has tested several prototypes including the Ocean-1, Ocean-2 and Wavehopper. They plan to scale up to larger Ocean-3 and Ocean-4 devices in future.

=== Ocean-2 ===
The Ocean-2 device has a spherical top section about 30 ft (9 m) in diameter mounted on top of a roughly 200 feet (61 m) long tubular hull. A test of the device in the Puget Sound in 2025 resulted in it generating up to 50 kW in decent wave conditions. The Ocean-2 was previously tested in 2024 in the Strait of Juan de Fuca, and the smaller Ocean-1 device in the same location in 2021.

== Future plans ==
As of May 2026, Panthalassa plan to deploy the pilot-series Ocean-3 device later this year, with commercial deployments in 2027. Construction of the Ocean-3 is well underway, and eventually the company plan to deploy thousands of nodes in the open ocean.
