= AN/UYK-7 =

Military 32-bit computer

The AN/UYK-7 was the standard 32-bit computer of the United States Navy for surface ship and submarine platforms, starting in 1970. It was used in the Navy's NTDS & Aegis combat systems and U.S. Coast Guard, and the navies of U.S. allies. It was also used by the U.S. Army.

In accordance with the Joint Electronics Type Designation System (JETDS), the "AN/UYK-7" designation represents the 7th design of an Army-Navy electronic device for general utility data processing computing equipment. The JETDS system also now is used to name all Department of Defense electronic systems.

== Technical ==
Built by UNIVAC, it used integrated circuits, had 18-bit addressing and could support multiple CPUs and I/O controllers. Three CPUs and two I/O controllers were a common configuration. Its multiprocessor architecture was based upon the UNIVAC 1108. An airborne version, the UNIVAC 1832, was also produced.

== Replacement ==
In the mid-1980s, the UYK-7 was replaced by the AN/UYK-43 which shared the same instruction set. Retired systems are being cannibalized for repair parts to support systems still in use by U.S. and non-U.S. forces.

== See also ==
- AN/USQ-20 30-bit computer that the AN/UYK-7 replaced
- AN/UYK-20 16-bit computer developed for navy projects that did not need the full power of the AN/UYK-7
- CMS-2
- List of military electronics of the United States
