= Vulnerability Discovery Model =

A Vulnerability Discovery Model (VDM) uses discovery event data with software reliability models for predicting the same. A thorough presentation of VDM techniques is available in. Numerous model implementations are available in the MCMCBayes open source repository. Several VDM examples include:

- Alhazmi-Malaiya: Time based model (Alhazmi-Malaiya Logistic (AML) model)
- Alhazmi-Malaiya: Effort based model
- Rescorla: Quadratic Model and Exponential Model
- Anderson: Thermodynamic Model
- Kim: Weibull Model
- Linear Model
- Hump-Shaped Model
- Independent and Dependent Model
- Vulnerability Discovery Modeling using Bayesian model averaging
- Multivariate Vulnerability Discovery Models

== See also ==
- Attack (computing)
- Computer security
- Information security
- IT risk
- Threat (computer)
- Vulnerability (computing)
