= Furniture repair =

Craft of repairing or restoring furniture so it is usable again

Furniture repair is the craft of making broken or worn furniture usable again. It may include the preservation of old furniture, which is referred to as restoration. The craft of furniture repair requires a number of different skills including woodworking, metalworking, wood finishing, caning (furniture), woodturning, and upholstery.

== Woodworking repair ==
Wood is the most abundantly used raw material to make a furniture piece. Wood provides the structure for upholstered pieces and is what finishes are applied to. Repairing wood requires knowledge of:

- Types of wood
- Types of furniture joinery
- Types of glue
- Woodworking techniques
- Woodworking tools

Some woodworking repairs can be done as DIY projects while others require more skilled woodworkers to complete. The most complex repairs involve reproducing replacement parts as well as restoring antiques.

== Finish repair ==
Refinishing means the existing finish is removed before a new finish is applied, whereas restoration refers to the process in which the original finish is cleaned, revived, and protected. Restoration protects the history and value of antique furniture.

Finish repair requires understanding the types of finishes and the corresponding techniques to clean, repair, and apply the finishes. The most common finishes include:

- Boiled linseed oil
- Tung oil
- Wax
- Shellac
- Lacquer
- Polyurethane

== Reupholstery ==
The process of recovering a piece of upholstered furniture with new fabric is called reupholstery. It begins with removing the existing upholstery, including the dust cover, tacks, fabric, muslin, padding, burlap, webbing, and springs. Once the furniture has been stripped of all upholstery, it can be repaired as the wooden joints of old furniture typically become loose. New upholstery should be reinstalled with consideration of reusing some of the old materials, such as horsehair, or replacing it with new materials.

== Antique restoration ==
Antiques need to be handled with care to preserve their value. As a rule of thumb, restoring up to 30 percent of the piece is acceptable on an antique; Exceeding this level may significantly reduce its value.

Modern glue should not be used on the joints of antique furniture. Hide glue is often preferred because it can be reversed for future repairs.

== Professional practice ==
Furniture repair is often carried out by trained tradespeople with backgrounds in carpentry and related disciplines. In some regions, practitioners may hold formal qualifications such as a Certificate III in Carpentry, which covers woodworking techniques, structural framing, and construction practices. More advanced roles may involve additional training in building and construction.

Depending on the type of work and jurisdiction, furniture repair professionals may be required to hold licences and insurance, particularly for structural repairs or high-value projects. These requirements help ensure compliance with safety regulations and quality standards.

The cost of furniture repair varies depending on the complexity of the task, materials used, and geographic location. Minor repairs such as adjustments or small timber fixes may be charged at hourly rates, while more extensive work, including cabinetry, framing, or restoration, generally incurs higher costs. Obtaining detailed quotes is a common practice to distinguish labour and material expenses.

When selecting a furniture repair professional, common considerations include verifying qualifications and insurance, reviewing examples of previous work, confirming whether materials and waste removal are included in the quote, and understanding timelines, warranties, and payment terms.

== Furniture repair industry ==
This industry is involved in reupholstering, refinishing, repairing and restoring furniture. The NAICS industry code is 811420 and includes:

- Reupholstering furniture
- Refinishing furniture
- Repairing and restoring furniture

== Entertainment ==
- The Repair Shop, a British television show
- "Furniture To Go", an American television show on PBS by Ed Feldman and Joe L'Erario
