= Availability zone =

Subset of an IT infrastructure system that shares no service-critical components

In cloud computing, an availability region is a group of data centres that are located in the same geographical region. Availability regions comprise multiple availability zones, which are groups of data centres that are located far enough from each other to prevent large-scale outages in the event of failure of a single zone, whilst still being close enough to each other to enable low-latency connections. Distributed systems spanning multiple availability zones allow for high availability, even in the event of catastrophic failure, such as natural disasters. Services offering distinct availability zones include Amazon Web Services, Microsoft Azure and Google Cloud.

== See also ==
- Single point of failure
- Active redundancy
