= Dutchman (repair) =

Short piece of material used for repairs

A dutchman, or in some uses graving piece, is a matching piece of good material used to replace a relatively small damaged area that has been cut out of a larger item, to avoid having to replace the entire item; or, any of various techniques for accomplishing such a repair. In some cases, the meaning has been extended to include small pieces that are inserted between units of a larger structure as a planned part of the construction process, rather than as an ad hoc repair. The term is used in woodworking, masonry, railroading, boatbuilding, theater, and other fields.

== Uses ==
=== Woodworking ===
In construction and woodworking, a dutchman can refer to an inset wood patch used to repair wood. Typically a square inset is cut into the damaged area and a new piece of wood is glued into the inset.

=== Masonry ===
In stone masonry, a Dutchman is an inset selectively replacing only the fault in a stone with new stone material, usually matching adjacent material as closely as possible.

=== Shipbuilding ===
In shipbuilding, boat-building and ship's carpentry, a dutchman repair can refer to repairs in metal as well as wood. The term Dutchman was first used in shipbuilding.

=== Railroading ===
In railroading, a dutchman is colloquially a short air brake extension hose or a temporary rail repair.

A rail repair dutchman is typically a 4–6-inch (100–150 mm) long piece of rail that is cut in advance for the purpose and carried by a section crew. If the gang finds a rail with a chipped or broken end, they remove the connector plates (fishplates), cut out the damaged section, replace it with the dutchman, and bolt the connectors back in place. This is often only a temporary repair.

When welding rails together using the Thermite process began at the start of the 20th century, a section of railhead approximately 3/4 inch (19 mm) long, also called a dutchman, was often placed between the sections being joined, with only the web and foot of the rail being new Thermite steel.

=== Theater ===
The term is also used in theatrical scenery construction, where a dutchman is a strip of material, usually canvas or muslin, used to cover the joint between two adjoining surfaces (such as flats). The strip is then painted or textured to match the adjoining pieces and create a seamless effect. Warp or weft threads can be removed from the edge of the dutchman to allow the edges to feather into the surrounding surface. On canvas flats, dutchman is usually applied with diluted white glue or paint.

=== Boilermaking ===
In the boiler industry, "dutchman" refers to the replacement section of tubing used to repair a tube failure.
