= Corrective maintenance =

Maintenance task to identify, isolate, and rectify a fault

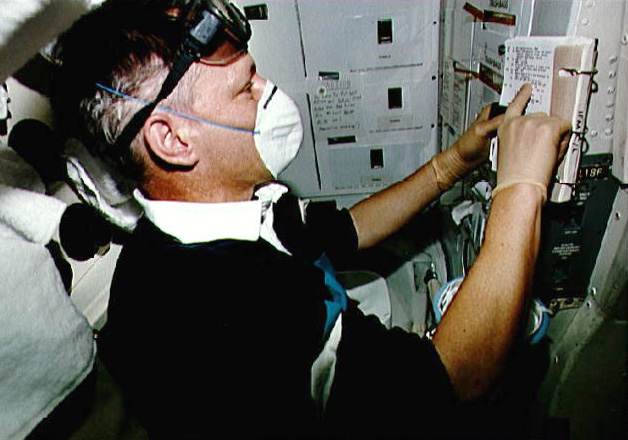
Inflight maintenance checklist procedure before starting waste collection system repair on board the Atlantis shuttle.

Corrective maintenance or repair is the act of fixing something that is damaged or broken. Its goal is to find (if not already identified) and rectify faults in an object or system, in order to restore it to sufficient working order.

Corrective maintenance is in contrast to preventive maintenance (performing upkeep to ensure that something keeps working properly) and inactive maintenance (keeping an asset that is out of service from breaking down further).

== Definition ==
A French official standard, NF EN 13306, defines "corrective maintenance" as maintenance which is carried out after failure detection and is aimed at restoring an asset to a condition in which it can perform its intended function.

Corrective maintenance can be subdivided into "immediate corrective maintenance" (in which work starts immediately after a failure) and "deferred corrective maintenance" (in which work is delayed in conformance to a given set of maintenance rules).

Sometimes, particularly in French-speaking countries, a distinction is made between curative maintenance and regular corrective maintenance. While the former is a larger scale procedure to permanently solve the problem (e.g. by replacing the defective mechanism), the latter only fixes the acute issue (e.g. only repairing or replacing an individual component) and might be a more temporary solution.

== Standards ==
The technical standards concerning corrective maintenance are set by IEC 60050 chapter 191 "Dependability and quality of service".

The NF EN 13306 X 60-319 is a subset of IEC 60050-191.

== Choice ==
The decision to choose corrective maintenance as a method of maintenance is a decision depending on several factors as the cost of downtime, reliability characteristics and redundancy of assets.

== Methods ==
The steps of corrective maintenance are, following failure: diagnosis – elimination of the part causing the failure – ordering the replacement – replacement of the part – test of function and finally the continuation of use.

The basic form of corrective maintenance is a step-by-step procedure. The object's failure triggers the steps. Modern technologies as the use of Industry 4.0 features reduce the inherent drawbacks of corrective maintenance. by e.g. providing device history, fault patterns, repair advice or availability of spare parts.

== See also ==
- Predictive maintenance
- Level of repair analysis
- Repairability
- Repairable component
- Mean time to repair
- Right to repair
- Repair cycle
- Repair kit
- Repair shop
- Dutchman (repair)
- Doctrine of repair and reconstruction, a concept in US patent law
- FUBAR, a military acronym for something that is too broken
- Tikkun olam, a Hebrew phrase meaning 'repairing the world'

=== Subtypes ===
- Automated program repair
- Book repair
- Climate repair
- Composite repair
- Computer repair
- Credit repair
- DNA repair
- Furniture repair
- Home repair
- Reputation repair
- Shoe repair

=== Vehicle repair and maintenance ===
- Aircraft maintenance
- Ausbesserungswerk – Railway workshops in Germany
- Auto mechanic
- Auxiliary repair dock
- Bike shop
- Dry dock
- Repair ship
- Ship repair
