= Composite repair =

Composite repair patch preparation and application

Composite repairs are performed on damaged laminate structures, fibre reinforced composites and other composite materials. The bonded composite repair reduces stresses in the damaged region and prevents cracks from opening or growing. Composite materials are used in a wide range of applications in aerospace, marine, automotive, surface transport and sports equipment markets. Damage to composite components is not always visible to the naked eye and the extent of damage is best determined for structural components by suitable Non Destructive Test (NDT) methods.

== Composite structures of interest ==
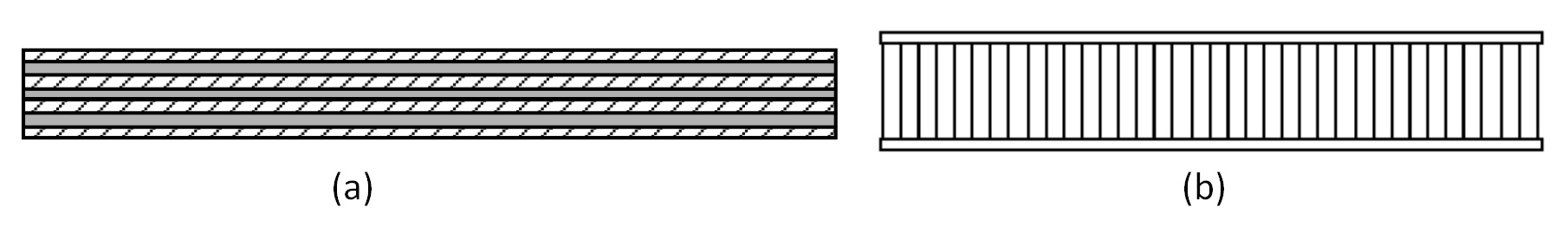
Figure 1: Composite structures (a) laminated and (b) sandwich

The composite structures of interest are mainly components composed of laminated plies or sandwich structures as shown in Figure 1. Laminate structures are assembled so that the fibre orientation provides most of the desired mechanical properties and the matrix largely determines the environmental performance. In sandwich structures thin, high strength skins are separated by, and bonded to, lightweight honeycomb cores; the thicker the core the stiffer the panel with minimal weight increase.

== Typical damage of composite structures ==
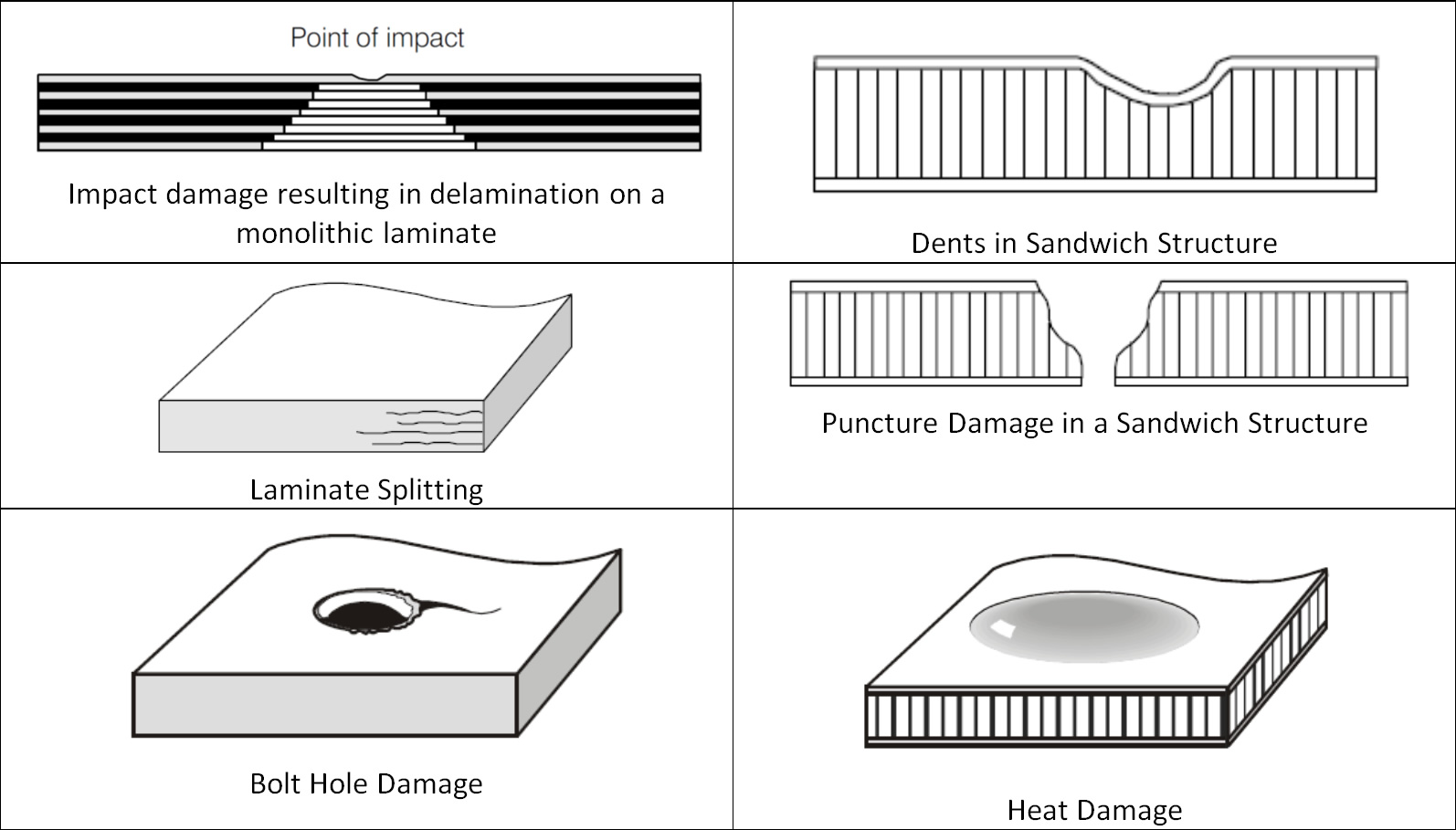
Figure 2: Typical damage cases of laminates and sandwich structures

The most important damage to fibre reinforced composites is the result of impact incidents. Low velocity and high velocity impact can result in significantly different damage patterns for a given composite configuration. In metals the impact energy is dissipated through elastic and plastic deformations and still the structure retains a good margin of structural integrity. In fibre reinforced composite materials however, the damage is usually more extensive than that seen on the surface. Some typical damage cases for composite structures are shown in Figure 2.

In monolithic laminates the underlying damage can extend to a much greater extent than the barely visible evidence on its surface. Other type of damage is laminate splitting. Here the damage does not extend through the full length of the part. The effects on the mechanical performance depend on the length of split relative to the component thickness.

In sandwich structures, impact results in dents of various sizes and depending on the energy levels, puncture damage is not unusual. In this case both skins may be damaged. Other common damage types include heat damage and bolt hole damage. The heat damage is caused by the exposure at high temperature which causes a local fracture with separation of surface plies. The bolt hole damage is caused by the bearing stresses at the contact surfaces of the composite structure with a bolt or rivet used for joining purposes. This could result in elongation of the hole causing laminate splitting, or damage to the upper plies. In any case, the effect on the mechanical performance depends on the thickness of the damaged part.

Further implications, apart from the initial impact damage, come from the exposure of the damaged area to moisture and other degrading factors like chemicals, lubricants, fuel, hydraulic fluids, etc. The presence of such environments may result in further deterioration of the mechanical performance.

== Repair flow chart ==
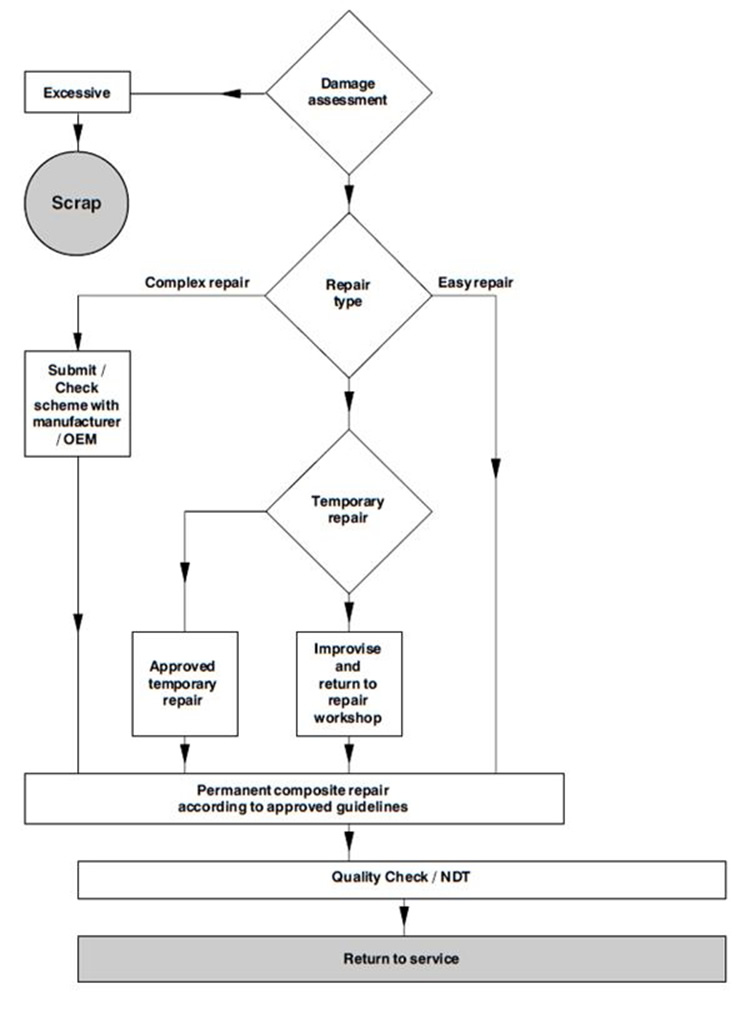
Figure 3: Typical composite repair flowchart

When performing a composite repair there are certain steps that should be followed. In Figure 3, a typical composite repair flowchart is given.

The first step in the procedure should be a careful damage assessment. Some damage to composites is obvious and easily assessed but in many cases the damage may first appear quite small, although the real damage is very much greater. Impact damage to a fibre can appear as a small dent on the reinforced composite surface but the underlying damage can be much more extensive. The decision to repair or scrap is determined by considering the extent of repair needed to replace the original structural performance of the composite. Other considerations are the repair costs, the position and accessibility of the damage and the availability of suitable repair materials.

The initial assessment will determine the repair type to be performed. Easy repairs are usually small or do not affect the structural integrity of the component. These repairs are made by following the simple guidelines indicated for laminate or sandwich panels. Complex repairs are needed when the damage is extensive and needs to replace the structural performance of the component. The best choice of materials would be to use the original fibres, fabrics and matrix resin. Any alternative would need careful consideration of the service environment of the repaired composite, i.e. hot, wet and mechanical performance. The proposed repair scheme should meet all the original design requirements for the structure.

Some repairs need the specialist equipment of the workshop and some form of improvised repair is needed to return the component to a suitable repair workshop. A temporary repair, usually in the form of a patch, can be fixed to the component to ensure safety until the component can be repaired at a later date. For a permanent repair all the approved general guidelines for laminate and sandwich repairs should be followed. These repair operations should be carried out in controlled workshop areas to ensure high quality. Operating in a controlled environment and attention to the detail will ensure success.

Before returning to service the quality check is always required. For comprehensive inspection of repaired parts, a number of Nondestructive Tests (NDT) can be used. Special attention should be given to the quality of the repaired area and more specifically to the interface between the original part and the repaired area. Usual inspection methods include some form of ultrasonic or X-ray inspection.

== Typical composite repairs ==
A typical composite repair usually starts after damage detection either by unaided eye or various other NDT-techniques. After evaluating the extent of the damage, the damage zone is prepared for reparation. This is done by removing the composite material around the damage zone 1. Three techniques are known to be utilized, being slightly different depending on the nature of the composite, as shown in Figure 4.

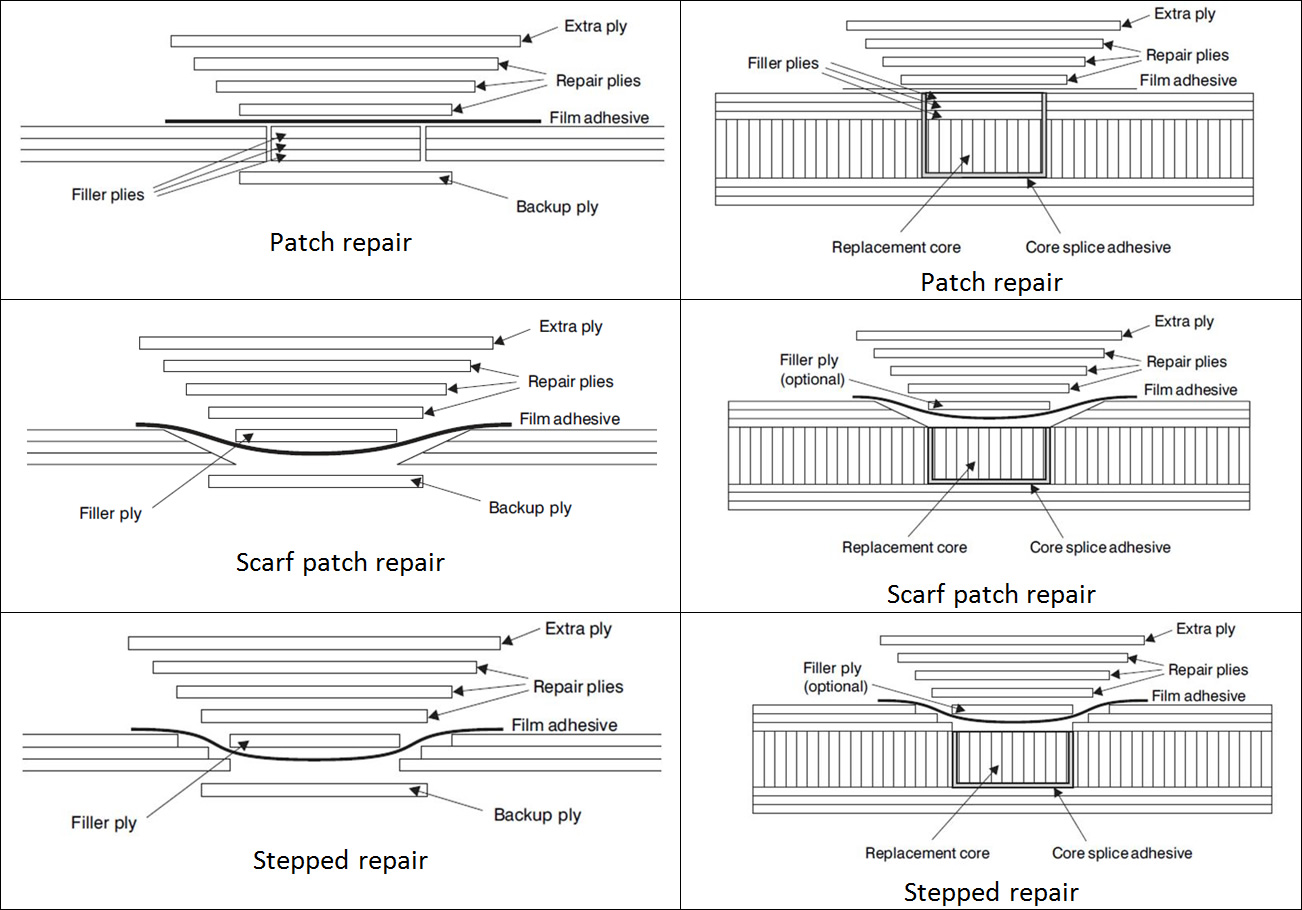
Figure 4: Typical laminate and sandwich repairs

When a composite repair is applied the proper surface treatment is essential for a successful result. The above-mentioned repairs can be time consuming and often require high skills and experience to be performed. This is why current developments tend to focus on automating this process either by advanced mechanical milling or alternate technologies like nanosecond-pulsed lasers 2-3. After the damage zone has been completely excavated, surfaces are cleaned and further prepared for the final repair by patches. This can be done by plasma burning of surface contaminants, exposing fibres by removing matrix material through laser radiation or improving the surface wettability for adhesives by photochemical reactions induced by UV-laser light 4.

In a typical repair, the patch is applied under vacuum and at temperatures high enough for the curing of the adhesive. For these purposes a portable hot bonder device may be used for in the field repairs. For more complex and higher quality repairs an autoclave should be used. A hot bonder unit is shown in Figure 5.

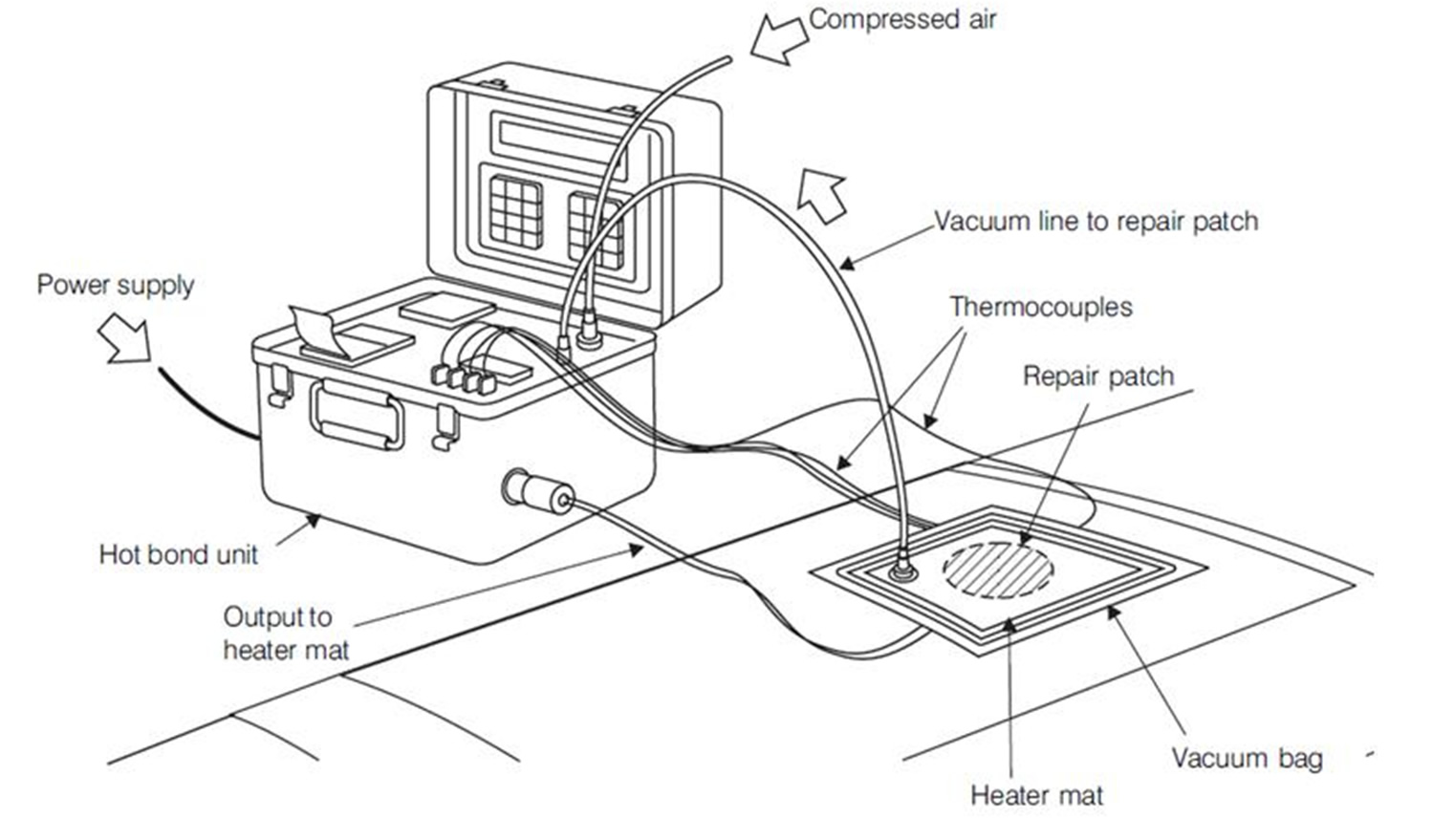
Figure 5: Typical hot bonder portable unit. It can apply vacuum, heat up the repair area and constantly monitor and regulate temperature

In any case, the application of a vacuum bag is a necessary step for high quality repairs. Vacuum bag processing is suited to components with thin sections and large sandwich structures. The vacuum bag technique involves the placing and sealing of a flexible bag over a composite lay-up and evacuating all the air from under the bag as schematically shown in Figure 6.

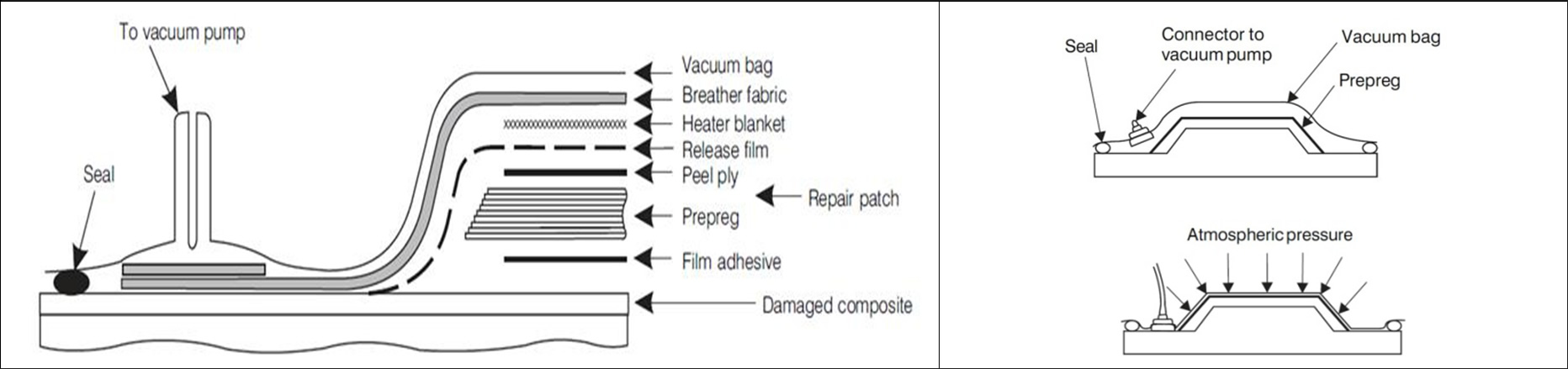
Figure 6: Left: Details of vacuum bag lay-up. Right: Vacuum bag sealing and vacuum application results in atmospheric pressure on the repair region (prepreg)

The removal of air forces the bag down onto the lay-up with consolidation pressure of 1 atmosphere (1 bar). The completed assembly, with vacuum still applied, is heated up to the desired temperature for curing. This can be achieved by using heating mat or by placing the assembly inside an oven with good air circulation. For thicker sections and high quality bonding, the use of an autoclave with regulated temperature and additional overpressure should be sought.

The most important technical challenges in the implementation of a successful composite patch repair are: (a) proper design of the repair patch and the procedures that will be followed, (b) selection of the most suitable materials and tools for the application, (c) careful surface preparation, (d) implementation of the composite patch repair and careful application of the cure cycle, (e) non-destructive evaluation of the repair by suitable methodology and, (f) monitoring of the structural integrity of the repair either at specific time intervals or continuously.
