= 451 Group =

American technology research company

451 Group is a New York City-based technology industry research firm. Through its Uptime Institute operating unit, the company provides research for data center operators. In December 2019, 451 Group sold an operating division, 451 Research, to information and analytics company S&P Global.

== History ==
The 451 Group was founded in April 2000 with offices in London, New York and San Francisco. The founding team of four all came from UK IT publishers ComputerWire. Initial funding came from the London-based listed brokerage firm Durlacher. Following the withdrawal of Durlacher and a management buyout, the company acquired Uptime Institute in 2009. Subsequent acquisitions included:

- consumer spending research firm ChangeWave Research in 2011
- events company Tech Touchstone in 2013
- mobile communications research firm Yankee Group in 2013
- IT professional community Wisegate in 2017.

The 451 Research division was acquired by S&P Global Market Intelligence on December 6, 2019.

== Business ==
Uptime Institute is the operating division of the 451 Group. It is an American professional services organization best known for its "Tier Standard". and the associated certification of data center compliance with the standard. Founded in 1987 by Kenneth G. Brill, the Uptime Institute positioned itself as an industry proponent to help owners and operators quantify and qualify their ability to provide a predictable level of performance from data centers, regardless of the status of external factors, such as power utilities.

451 Research was formerly part of 451 Group. Until being acquired by S&P Global in December 2019, it was an information technology industry analyst firm, headquartered in New York with offices in London, Boston, Washington DC, and San Francisco. At the time of the acquisition 451 Research claimed to have 250 employees, over 100 industry analysts and over 1000 clients. It produced qualitative and quantitative research, across thirteen research channels, targeting service providers, technology vendors, enterprise IT leaders and financial professionals.

== See also ==
- High availability
- Downtime
- Uptime
