= Department of Defense Dictionary of Military and Associated Terms =

The Department of Defense Dictionary of Military and Associated Terms (abbreviated as DoD Dictionary) is a compendium of terminology used by the United States Department of Defense (DoD). The print version consists of 574 pages of terms and 140 pages of acronyms.

It sets forth standard US military and associated terminology to encompass the joint activity of the Armed Forces of the United States in both US joint and allied joint operations, as well as to encompass the Department of Defense (DoD) as a whole. These military and associated terms, together with their definitions, constitute approved DoD terminology for general use by all components of the Department of Defense. The Secretary of Defense, by DoD Directive 5025.12, 23 August 1989, Standardization of Military and Associated Terminology, has directed its use throughout the Department of Defense to ensure standardization of military and associated terminology.

This publication supplements standard English-language dictionaries with standard terminology for military and associated use. However, it is not the intent of this publication to restrict the authority of the joint force commander (JFC) from organizing the force and executing the mission in a manner the JFC deems most appropriate to ensure unity of effort in the accomplishment of the overall mission.

== See also ==
- Glossary of military abbreviations
