= Repair shop =

A repair shop is a room or building where something is repaired.

Specific kinds include:

- an automobile repair shop, including body shops
- a railway repair shop or Ausbesserungswerk (in German-speaking countries)
- a military backshop
- a military logistics center that acts as a repair depot
- a workshop

== See also ==
- Industrial arts
