= Predictive maintenance =

Method to predict when equipment should be maintained

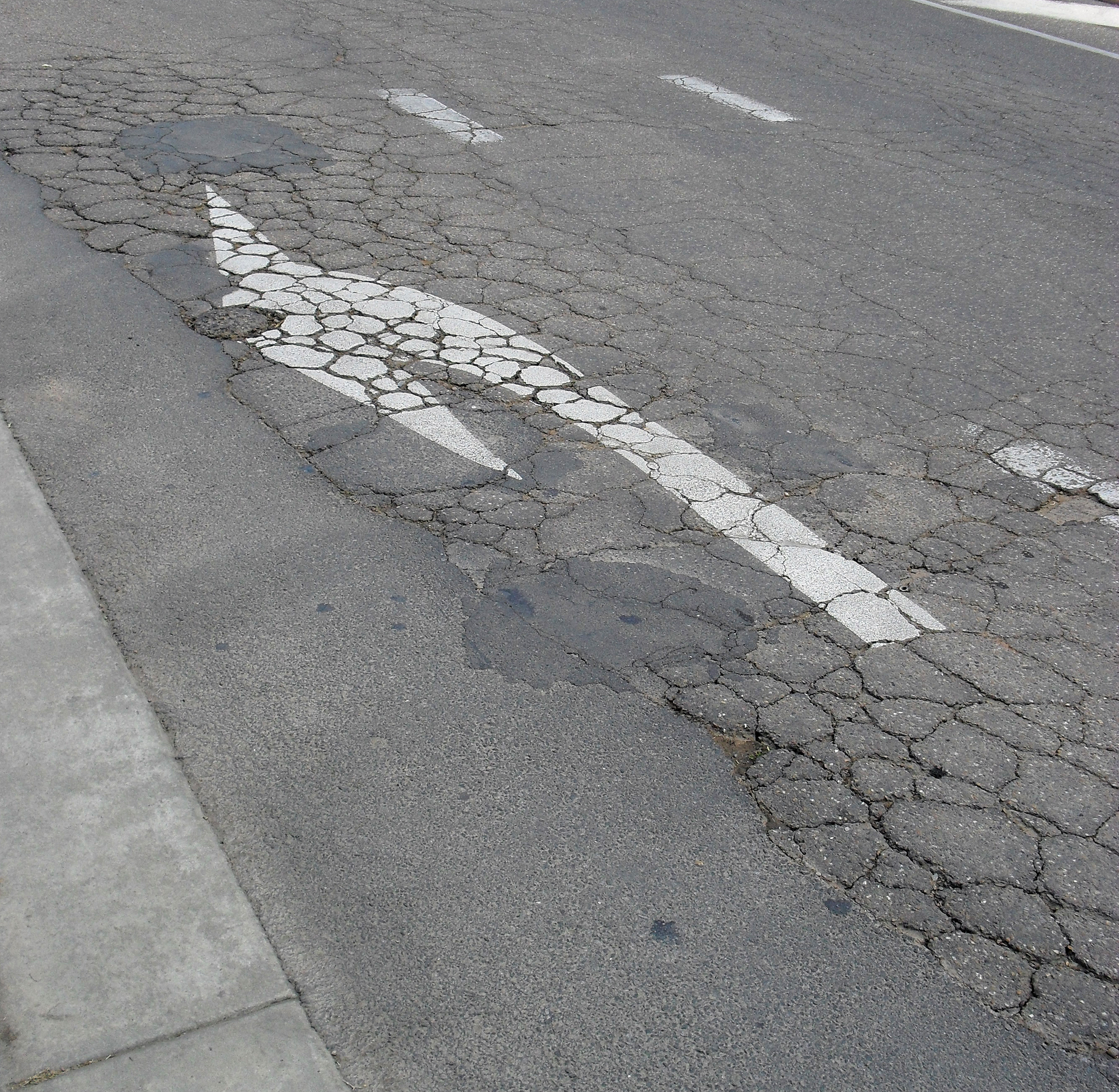
The nature and degree of asphalt deterioration is analyzed for predictive maintenance of roadways. See more at Pavement condition index.

Predictive maintenance techniques are designed to help determine the condition of in-service equipment in order to estimate when maintenance should be performed. This approach claims more cost savings over routine or time-based preventive maintenance, because tasks are performed only when warranted. Thus, it is regarded as condition-based maintenance carried out as suggested by estimations of the degradation state of an item.

The main appeal of predictive maintenance is to allow convenient scheduling of corrective maintenance, and to prevent unexpected equipment failures. By taking into account measurements of the state of the equipment, maintenance work can be better planned (spare parts, people, etc.) and what would have been "unplanned stops" are transformed to shorter and fewer "planned stops", thus increasing plant availability. Other potential advantages include increased equipment lifetime, increased plant safety, fewer accidents with negative impact on environment, and optimized spare parts handling.

Predictive maintenance differs from preventive maintenance because it does take into account the current condition of equipment (with measurements), instead of average or expected life statistics, to predict when maintenance will be required. Machine Learning approaches are adopted for the forecasting of its future states.

Some of the main components that are necessary for implementing predictive maintenance are data collection and preprocessing, early fault detection, fault detection, time to failure prediction, and maintenance scheduling and resource optimization. Predictive maintenance has been considered to be one of the driving forces for improving productivity and one of the ways to achieve "just-in-time" in manufacturing.

== Overview ==
Predictive maintenance evaluates the condition of equipment by performing periodic (offline) or continuous (online) equipment condition monitoring. The ultimate goal of the approach is to perform maintenance at a scheduled point in time when the maintenance activity is most cost-effective and before the equipment loses performance within a threshold. This results in a reduction in unplanned downtime costs because of failure, where costs can be in the hundreds of thousands per day depending on industry. In energy production, in addition to loss of revenue and component costs, fines can be levied for non-delivery, increasing costs even further. This is in contrast to time- and/or operation count-based maintenance, where a piece of equipment gets maintained whether it needs it or not. Time-based maintenance is labor intensive, ineffective in identifying problems that develop between scheduled inspections, and therefore is not cost-effective.

The "predictive" component of predictive maintenance stems from the goal of predicting the future trend of the equipment's condition. This approach uses principles of statistical process control to determine at what point in the future maintenance activities will be appropriate.

Most predictive inspections are performed while equipment is in service, thereby minimizing disruption of normal system operations. Adoption of predictive maintenance can result in substantial cost savings and higher system reliability. In today's dynamic landscape of service maintenance, prolonged repair processes present a significant challenge for organizations striving to maintain operational excellence. Extended downtime, increased Mean Time to Repair (MTTR), and production losses not only affect profitability but also disrupt service continuity and diminish customer satisfaction. As equipment ages and maintenance requirements intensify, the quest for innovative solutions becomes increasingly urgent.

One goal is to transfer the predictive maintenance data to a computerized maintenance management system so that the equipment condition data is sent to the right equipment object to trigger maintenance planning, work order execution, and reporting. Unless this is achieved, the predictive maintenance solution is of limited value, at least if the solution is implemented on a medium to large size plant with tens of thousands pieces of equipment. In 2010, the mining company Boliden, implemented a combined Distributed Control System and predictive maintenance solution integrated with the plant computerized maintenance management system on an object to object level, transferring equipment data using protocols like Highway Addressable Remote Transducer Protocol, IEC61850 and OLE for process control.

== Technologies ==
To evaluate equipment condition, predictive maintenance utilizes nondestructive testing technologies such as infrared, acoustic (partial discharge and airborne ultrasonic), corona detection, vibration analysis, sound level measurements, oil analysis, and other specific online tests. A new approach in this area is to utilize measurements on the actual equipment in combination with measurement of process performance, measured by other devices, to trigger equipment maintenance. This is primarily available in collaborative process automation systems (CPAS). Site measurements are often supported by wireless sensor networks to reduce the wiring cost.

Vibration analysis is most productive on high-speed rotating equipment and can be the most expensive component of a PdM program to get up and running. Vibration analysis, when properly done, allows the user to evaluate the condition of equipment and avoid failures. The latest generation of vibration analyzers comprises more capabilities and automated functions than its predecessors. Many units display the full vibration spectrum of three axes simultaneously, providing a snapshot of what is going on with a particular machine. But despite such capabilities, not even the most sophisticated equipment successfully predicts developing problems unless the operator understands and applies the basics of vibration analysis.

In certain situations, strong background noise interferences from several competing sources may mask the signal of interest and hinder the industrial applicability of vibration sensors. Consequently, motor current signature analysis (MCSA) is a non-intrusive alternative to vibration measurement which has the potential to monitor faults from both electrical and mechanical systems.

Remote visual inspection is the first non-destructive testing. It provides a cost-efficient primary assessment. Essential information and defaults can be deduced from the external appearance of the piece, such as folds, breaks, cracks, and corrosion. The remote visual inspection has to be carried out in good conditions with a sufficient lighting (350 LUX at least). When the part of the piece to be controlled is not directly accessible, an instrument made of mirrors and lenses called endoscope is used. Hidden defects with external irregularities may indicate a more serious defect inside.

Acoustical analysis can be done on a sonic or ultrasonic level. New ultrasonic techniques for condition monitoring make it possible to "hear" friction and stress in rotating machinery, which can predict deterioration earlier than conventional techniques. Ultrasonic technology is sensitive to high-frequency sounds that are inaudible to the human ear and distinguishes them from lower-frequency sounds and mechanical vibration. Machine friction and stress waves produce distinctive sounds in the upper ultrasonic range. Changes in these friction and stress waves can suggest deteriorating conditions much earlier than technologies such as vibration or oil analysis. With proper ultrasonic measurement and analysis, it's possible to differentiate normal wear from abnormal wear, physical damage, imbalance conditions, and lubrication problems based on a direct relationship between asset and operating conditions.

Sonic monitoring equipment is less expensive, but it also has fewer uses than ultrasonic technologies. Sonic technology is useful only on mechanical equipment, while ultrasonic equipment can detect electrical problems and is more flexible and reliable in detecting mechanical problems.

Infrared monitoring and analysis has the widest range of application (from high- to low-speed equipment), and it can be effective for spotting both mechanical and electrical failures; some consider it to currently be the most cost-effective technology. Oil analysis is a long-term program that, where relevant, can eventually be more predictive than any of the other technologies. It can take years for a plant's oil program to reach this level of sophistication and effectiveness. Analytical techniques performed on oil samples can be classified in two categories: used oil analysis and wear particle analysis. Used oil analysis determines the condition of the lubricant itself, determines the quality of the lubricant, and checks its suitability for continued use. Wear particle analysis determines the mechanical condition of machine components that are lubricated. Through wear particle analysis, you can identify the composition of the solid material present and evaluate particle type, size, concentration, distribution, and morphology.

The use of Model Based Condition Monitoring for predictive maintenance programs is becoming increasingly popular over time. This method involves spectral analysis on the motor's current and voltage signals and then compares the measured parameters to a known and learned model of the motor to diagnose various electrical and mechanical anomalies. This process of "model based" condition monitoring was originally designed and used on NASA's space shuttle to monitor and detect developing faults in the space shuttle's main engine. It allows for the automation of data collection and analysis tasks, providing round the clock condition monitoring and warnings about faults as they develop. Other predictive maintenance methods are related to smart testing strategies.

== Applications ==
=== Environmental monitoring ===
- Detect changes of the calibration distribution (i.e., statistical distribution of pollutants and environmental conditions) for low-cost gas sensor systems.

=== Railway ===
- Detect warning signs before they cause downtime for linear, fixed and mobile assets.
- Improving safety and track void detection through a new vehicle cab-based monitoring system
- Can also identify the type of track asset that the void is located under and provide an indication of the severity of the void
- Health Monitoring of point Machines (devices used to operate railway turnouts) can aid in detecting early symptoms of degradation prior to failure.·

=== Manufacturing ===
- Early fault detection and diagnosis in the manufacturing industry.
- Manufacturers increasingly collect big data from Internet of Things (IoT) sensors in their factories and products and using different algorithms for the collected data to detect warning signs of expensive failures before they occur.

=== Oil and gas ===
- Oil and gas companies often lack visibility into the condition of their equipment, especially in remote offshore and deep-water locations.
- Big data can provide insight to oil and gas companies, this way equipment failures and the optimal lifetime of the system and components can be analyzed and predicted.

== See also ==
- Computerized maintenance management system
- Intelligent maintenance system
- Production flow analysis
- RCASE
- Root cause analysis
