= Design for availability =

Design for Availability is the design process for a system targeting availability of the system for guarantying readiness as the major part of goal specification. This design is generally used toward availability based contracts. Design for availability means that design process should start by given parameters of requirement space and maps them to design parameter space. However, the conventional trial and error of parameters set followed by sensitivity analysis might end to the same result area in the design plane.

== Description ==
The design parameters generally include reliability, maintainability of the system. Reliability will be the result of manufacturing of the system where as maintainability is coming from operational, maintenance logistics, inventory management, Prognostic Health Management (PHM) and supply chain design of the services that system require. The general usage of this philosophy of system design is geared toward outcome-based contracts. Availability is the major factor of operational effectiveness along with performance of the system. Availability based contracts are not as complicated as performance based contract because the discussion over metrics and requirement is less obscure to define for customer and designer. Minimum required availability of complex system is a key factor of many distributed and repairable systems like ATM network or Airliner.

In Availability-based Contracts, instead of parts, the supplier is paid for a guaranteed level of services, performance, and system capability, similar to availability-based tariffs for electric power. The supplier often has to guarantee the availability and preparedness of system at lesser costs by considering the logistics as part of design. The contractor will also have more control over logistics and supply chain of system. The key point of using availability instead of Performance is that combining availability of different part of one platform or system from its subsets is feasible and easy unlike dealing with obscure measures of performance in Performance based logistics.

Recent interest in availability contracts that specify a required availability has created an interest in deriving system design and support parameters directly from an availability-based contracts. But, a point to point allocation from parameter of operation and support to meet availability requirement in the performance space, given the required availability distribution is a direct way of design which must be followed by a sensitivity analysis and robustness of parameters. However, determining design parameters from an availability requirement is a stochastic reverse design problem.

Evaluating an availability requirement is a challenge for manufacturers and supporters of systems because determining how to deliver a specific availability is not trivial. The required availability can be defined over the instance of system or over the fleet. It can be defined over different time windows or in different geographical boxes. However availability optimization approaches provide solutions only at selected points in time (not all times), using mean time to failure (or fixed rate demand) and mean time to repair as deterministic values as part of convex optimization.

Availability engineering in network world is generally toward reducing unplanned downtime or planned downtime by providing redundancy or fast switching systems. This area of design is the subject of different discipline with different approach. The main difference between network industry and manufacturing availability is that former is more targeting toward decreasing downtime where as in reliability world it might be seen as using higher reliability part in a cost-effective manner.

== See also ==
- Performance-based logistics
- High availability
- Pay for performance (healthcare)
- Power by the Hour
