= Shop-replaceable unit =

Modular component designed to be replaced by a technician at a backshop

A shop-replaceable unit (SRU) or shop-replaceable component (SRC) is a modular component of an airplane, ship or spacecraft that is designed to be replaced by a technician at a backshop. Repair at backshops is known as field-level maintenance or intermediate-level (I-level) maintenance.

SRUs are similar in nature to line-replaceable units (LRUs), but rather than being complete functional units, represent component functions, such as circuit card assemblies, of a larger LRU. SRUs are typically assigned logistics control numbers (LCNs) or work unit codes (WUCs) to manage logistics operations.

SRUs can be stocked to allow for quick remove and replace (R&R) operations on their parent LRUs or LLRUs, while also allowing for more extended repair operations at the backshop.

Calibration and repair of United States Air Force test equipment is conducted at shops known as precision measurement equipment laboratories.

== See also ==
- Aircraft maintenance
- Avionics
- Field-replaceable unit
- Level of repair analysis
- Line-replaceable unit
- Maintenance, repair, and operations
- Spare part
