= Spare part =

Interchangeable part used for repair

A spare part, spare, service part, repair part, or replacement part, is an interchangeable part that is kept in an inventory and used for the repair or refurbishment of defective equipment/units. Spare parts are an important feature of logistics engineering and supply chain management, often comprising dedicated spare parts management systems.

Spare parts are an outgrowth of the industrial development of interchangeable parts and mass production.

In an industrial environment, spare parts are described in several manner to distinguish key features of various spare parts. The following describes spare part types and their typically functionality.

1. Capital parts are spare parts which, although acknowledged to have a long life or a small chance of failure, would cause a long shutdown of equipment because it would take a long time to get a replacement for them. Capital parts are typically repaired or replaced during planned overhauls/scheduled inspections. As description implies, these capital parts are typically expensive and are depreciated over time.

Examples of capital parts include pumps and motor sets used in industrial plants, or impeller or a rotor required for a pump or motor. This “spare” requirement would be determined by redundancy of equipment used in the industrial processes.

2. Consumables can be divided into two groups:

- Operational consumables are typically consumed during operation and an example of these would be air filters, grease and lubricants, light bulbs, etc. (for a car, it would be washer fluid)
- Inspection consumables are typically replaced during planned overhauls/scheduled inspections and an example of these would be fan belt, gaskets, lube oil, oil filters, etc. (for a car, it would be engine oil or transmission oil)

3. Inspection spares or outage spares typically refer to those spare parts used in conjunction with capital parts during planned overhauls/scheduled inspections and maybe reused but typically are not repairable and are discarded after removal from use if inspection spares are damaged. These inspection spares are sometimes mis-characterized as capital spares (vs capital parts) and are also confounded with inspection consumables, which must be replaced at every inspection/outage (an example of inspection spares would be bearings and mechanical seals, large bolts and nuts).

4. Operational spares typically refer to those spare parts that are used during operation of equipment and would not require planned overhauls/scheduled inspections to replace. In an industrial setting, operational spares would be gauges, valves (solenoid, MOVs that are in redundancy), transmitters, I/O boards, small AC/DC power supplies, etc.) (for a car, it would windshield wiper)

== Classification ==
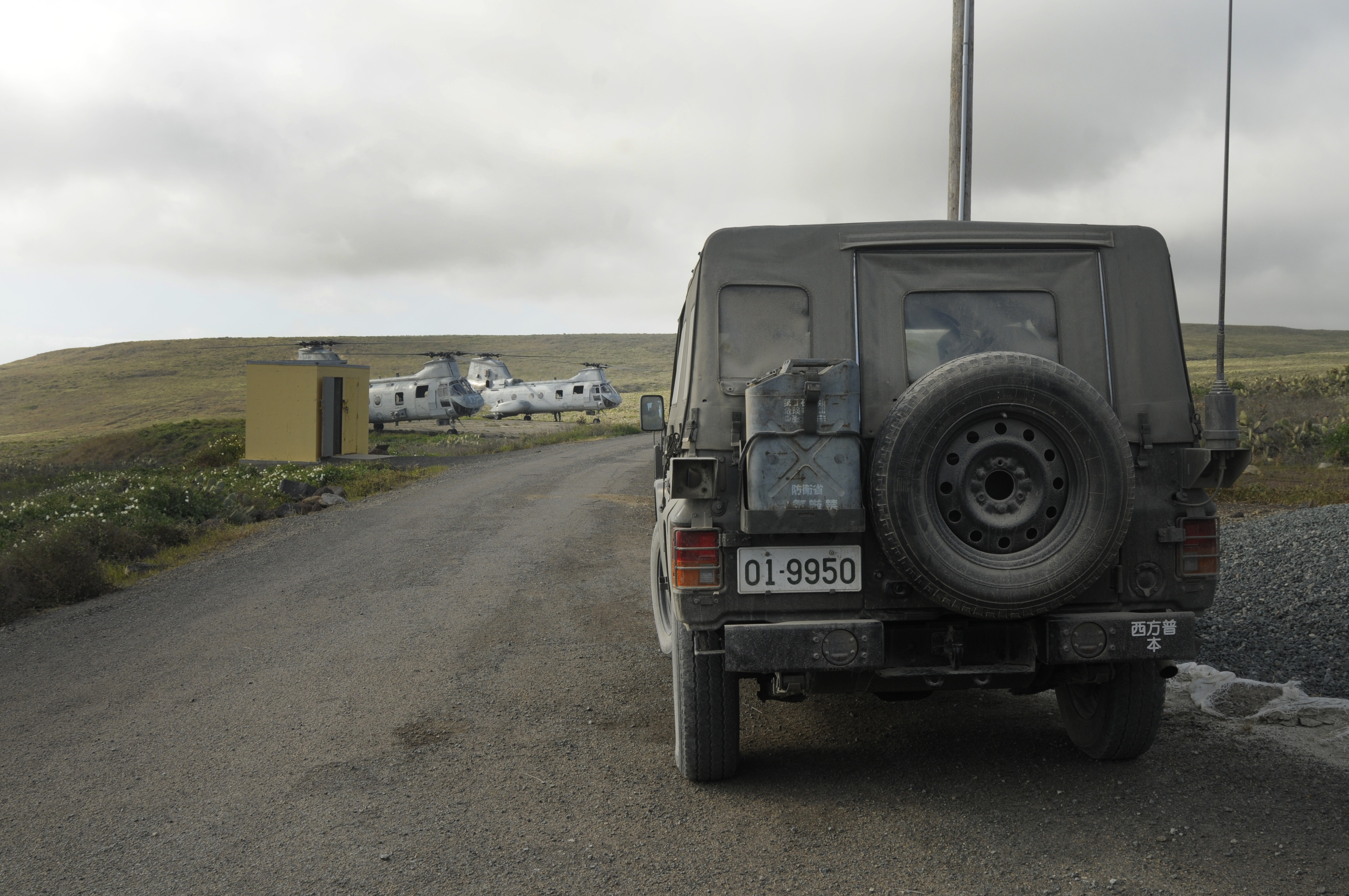
A spare tire mounted at the rear of a Mitsubishi Type 73 Light Truck as an example of a repairable spare part.

In logistics, spare parts can be broadly classified into two groups, repairables and consumables.

Economically, there is a tradeoff between the cost of ordering a replacement part and the cost of repairing a failed part. When the cost of repair becomes a significant percentage of the cost of replacement, it becomes economically favorable to simply order a replacement part. In such cases, the part is said to be "beyond economic repair" (BER), and the percentage associated with this threshold is known as the BER rate. Analysis of economic tradeoffs is formally evaluated using level of repair analysis (LORA).

=== Repairable ===
Repairable parts are parts that are deemed worthy of repair, usually by virtue of economic consideration of their repair cost. Rather than bear the cost of completely replacing a finished product, repairables typically are designed to enable more affordable maintenance by being more modular. That allows components to be more easily removed, repaired, and replaced, enabling cheaper replacement. Spare parts that are needed to support condemnation of repairable parts are known as replenishment spares .

A rotable pool is a pool of repairable spare parts inventory set aside to allow for multiple repairs to be accomplished simultaneously, which can be used to minimize stockout conditions for repairable items.

=== Consumable ===
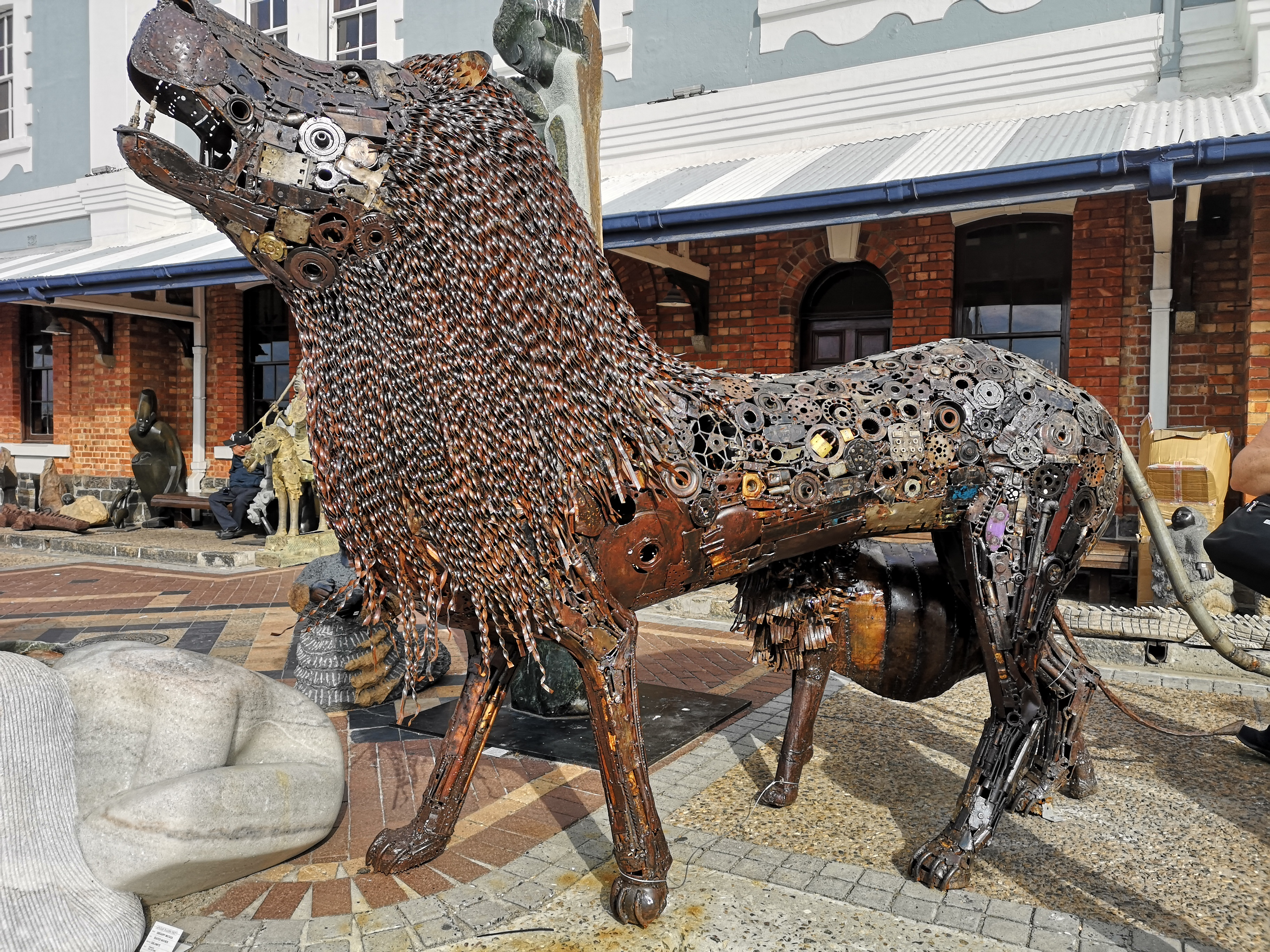
Art design from recycled spare parts (South Africa).

Parts that are not repairable are considered consumable parts. Consumable parts are usually scrapped, or "decommissioned", when they are found to have failed. Since no attempt at repair is made, for a fixed mean time between failures (MTBF), replacement rates for consumption of consumables are higher than an equivalent item treated as a repairable part. One example is in heavy machinery such as brake oils, hydraulic fluids, and belts.

Because consumables are lower cost and higher volume, economies of scale can be found by ordering in large lot sizes, a so-called economic order quantity.

=== Commercial classification ===
From a commercial perspective, spare parts can be classified into three main types:

OEM (original equipment manufacturer) parts: These parts are produced by the same manufacturer that made the original equipment.

Aftermarket parts: These are replacement parts made by companies other than the original manufacturer. They can serve as cost-effective substitutes for OEM parts.

Used or second-hand parts: These can be either OEM or aftermarket parts that have been refurbished and resold at a lower price.

== Legislation ==
There is no UK or EU legislation which states that spare parts have to be available for any set period of time, but some trade associations require their members to ensure products are not rendered useless because spare parts are not available. The 'six year rule' in the UK Sale of Goods Act 1979 relates to the time period for enforcing claims that goods were defective when sold, not to whether spare parts are available to repair them, and section 23(3) of the Consumer Rights Act 2015 states that a consumer cannot require a trader to repair or replace goods if "the repair or replacement is impossible", implying that if spare parts are no longer available the consumer's right to repair (or to have a spare part supplied) would be lost.

== Repair cycle ==
From the perspective of logistics, a model of the life cycle of parts in a supply chain can be developed. This model, called the repair cycle, consists of functioning parts in use by equipment operators, and the entire sequence of suppliers or repair providers that replenish functional part inventories, either by production or repair, when they have failed. Ultimately, this sequence ends with the manufacturer. This type of model allows demands on a supply system to ultimately be traced to their operational reliability, allowing for analysis of the dynamics of the supply system, in particular, spare parts.

== Inventory management ==
=== Cannibalization ===
When stockout conditions occur, cannibalization can result. This is the practice of removing parts or subsystems necessary for repair from another similar device, rather than from inventory. The source system is usually crippled as a result, if only temporarily, in order to allow the recipient device to function properly again. As a result, operational availability is impaired.

== Commercial ==
Industrialization has seen the widespread growth of commercial manufacturing enterprises, such as the automotive industry, and later, the computer industry. The resulting complex systems have evolved modular support infrastructures, with the reliance on auto parts in the automotive industry, and replaceable computer modules known as field-replaceable units (FRUs).

== Military ==
Military operations are significantly affected by logistics operations. The system availability, also known as mission capable rate, of weapon systems and the ability to effect the repair of damaged equipment are significant contributors to the success of military operations. Systems that are in a mission-incapable (MICAP) status due lack of spare parts are said to be "awaiting parts" (AWP), also known as not mission capable due to supply (NMCS).

Because of this sensitivity to logistics, militaries have sought to make their logistics operations as effective as possible, focusing effort on operations research and optimal maintenance. Maintenance has been simplified by the introduction of interchangeable modules known as line-replaceable units (LRUs). LRUs make it possible to quickly replace an unserviceable (failed) part with a serviceable (working) replacement. This makes it relatively straightforward to repair complex military hardware, at the expense of having a ready supply of spare parts.

The cost of having serviceable parts available in inventory can be tremendous, as items that are prone to failure may be demanded frequently from inventory, requiring significant inventory levels to avoid depletion. For military programs, the cost of spare inventory can be a significant portion of acquisition cost.

In recent years, the United States Department of Defense (DoD) has advocated the use of performance-based logistics (PBL) contracts to manage costs for support of weapon systems.

== See also ==
- Buffer stock scheme
- Carrier onboard delivery
- Complete knock down
- Demand chain
- Flight spare
- Logistics support analysis
- Military surplus
- Overstock
- Reorder point
- Safety stock
- Service life (lifespan)
- Spare tire
- Underway replenishment
- Warranty
- War reserve stock
