= Integrated logistics support =

Technology relating to maintenance systems

Integrated logistics support (ILS) is a technology in the system engineering to lower a product life cycle cost and decrease demand for logistics by the maintenance system optimization to ease the product support. Although originally developed for military purposes, it is also widely used in commercial customer service organisations.

== ILS defined ==
In general, ILS plans and directs the identification and development of logistics support and system requirements for military systems, with the goal of creating systems that last longer and require less support, thereby reducing costs and increasing return on investments. ILS therefore addresses these aspects of supportability not only during acquisition, but also throughout the operational life cycle of the system. The impact of ILS is often measured in terms of metrics such as reliability, availability, maintainability and testability (RAMT), and sometimes system safety (RAMS).

ILS is the integrated planning and action of a number of disciplines in concert with one another to assure system availability. The planning of each element of ILS is ideally developed in coordination with the system engineering effort and with each other. Tradeoffs may be required between elements in order to acquire a system that is: affordable (lowest life cycle cost), operable, supportable, sustainable, transportable, and environmentally sound. In some cases, a deliberate process of logistics support analysis will be used to identify tasks within each logistics support element.

The most widely accepted list of ILS activities include:

- Reliability engineering, maintainability engineering and maintenance (preventive, predictive and corrective) planning
- Supply (spare part) support acquire resources
- Support and test equipment/equipment support
- Manpower and personnel
- Training and training support
- Technical data/publications
- Computer resources support
- Facilities
- Packaging, handling, storage and transportation
- Design interface

Decisions are documented in a life cycle sustainment plan (LCSP), a supportability strategy, or (most commonly) an integrated logistics support plan (ILSP). ILS planning activities coincide with development of the system acquisition strategy, and the program will be tailored accordingly. A properly executed ILS strategy will ensure that the requirements for each of the elements of ILS are properly planned, resourced, and implemented. These actions will enable the system to achieve the operational readiness levels required by the warfighter at the time of fielding and throughout the life cycle. ILS can be also used for civilian projects, as highlighted by the ASD/AIA ILS guide.

It is considered common practice within some industries - primarily defence - for ILS practitioners to take a leave of absence to undertake an ILS sabbatical; furthering their knowledge of the logistics engineering disciplines. ILS Sabbaticals are normally taken in developing nations - allowing the practitioner an insight into sustainment practices in an environment of limited materiel resources.

== Adoption ==
ILS is a technique introduced by the US Army to ensure that the supportability of an equipment item is considered during its design and development. The technique was adopted by the UK MoD in 1993 and made compulsory for the procurement of the majority of MOD equipment.

- Influence on design. Integrated logistic support will provide important means to identify (as early as possible) reliability issues / problems and can initiate system or part design improvements based on reliability, maintainability, testability or system availability analysis
- Design of the support solution for minimum cost. Ensuring that the support solution considers and integrates the elements considered by ILS. This is discussed fully below.
- Initial support package. These tasks include calculation of requirements for spare parts, special tools, and documentation. Quantities required for a specified initial period are calculated, procured, and delivered to support delivery, installation in some of the cases, and operation of the equipment.

The ILS management process facilitates specification, design, development, acquisition, test, fielding, and support of systems.

== Maintenance planning ==
Maintenance planning begins early in the acquisition process with development of the maintenance concept. It is conducted to evolve and establish requirements and tasks to be accomplished for achieving, restoring, and maintaining the operational capability for the life of the system. Maintenance planning also involves Level Of Repair Analysis (LORA) as a function of the system acquisition process. Maintenance planning will:

- Define the actions and support necessary to ensure that the system attains the specified system readiness objectives with minimum life cycle cost (LCC).
- Set up specific criteria for repair, including built-in test equipment (BITE) requirements, testability, reliability, and maintainability; support equipment requirements; automatic test equipment; and manpower skills and facility requirements.
- State specific maintenance tasks, to be performed on the system.
- Define actions and support required for fielding and marketing the system.
- Address warranty considerations.
- The maintenance concept must ensure prudent use of manpower and resources. When formulating the maintenance concept, analysis of the proposed work environment on the health and safety of maintenance personnel must be considered.
- Conduct a LORA to optimize the support system, in terms of LCC, readiness objectives, design for discard, maintenance task distribution, support equipment and ATE, and manpower and personnel requirements.
- Minimize the use of hazardous materials and the generation of waste.

== Supply support ==
Supply support encompasses all management actions, procedures, and techniques used to determine requirements to:

- Acquire support items and spare parts.
- Catalog the items.
- Receive the items.
- Store and warehouse the items.
- Transfer the items to where they are needed.
- Issue the items.
- Dispose of secondary items.
- Provide for initial support of the system.
- Acquire, distribute, and replenish inventory

== Support and test equipment ==
Support and test equipment includes all equipment, mobile and fixed, that is required to perform the support functions, except that equipment which is an integral part of the system. Support equipment categories include:

- Handling and maintenance equipment.
- Tools (hand tools as well as power tools).
- Metrology and measurement devices.
- Calibration equipment.
- Test equipment.
- Automatic test equipment.
- Support equipment for on- and off-equipment maintenance.
- Special inspection equipment and depot maintenance plant equipment, which includes all equipment and tools required to assemble, disassemble, test, maintain, and support the production and/or depot repair of end items or components.

This also encompasses planning and acquisition of logistic support for this equipment.

== Manpower and personnel ==
Manpower and personnel involves identification and acquisition of personnel with skills and grades required to operate and maintain a system over its lifetime. Manpower requirements are developed and personnel assignments are made to meet support demands throughout the life cycle of the system. Manpower requirements are based on related ILS elements and other considerations. Human factors engineering (HFE) or behavioral research is frequently applied to ensure a good man-machine interface. Manpower requirements are predicated on accomplishing the logistics support mission in the most efficient and economical way. This element includes requirements during the planning and decision process to optimize numbers, skills, and positions. This area considers:

- Man-machine and environmental interface
- Special skills
- Human factors considerations during the planning and decision process

== Training and training devices ==
Training and training devices support encompasses the processes, procedures, techniques, training devices, and equipment used to train personnel to operate and support a system. This element defines qualitative and quantitative requirements for the training of operating and support personnel throughout the life cycle of the system. It includes requirements for:

- Competencies management
- Factory training
- Instructor and key personnel training
- New equipment training team
- Resident training
- Sustainment training
- User training
- HAZMAT disposal and safe procedures training

Embedded training devices, features, and components are designed and built into a specific system to provide training or assistance in the use of the system. (One example of this is the HELP files of many software programs.) The design, development, delivery, installation, and logistic support of required embedded training features, mockups, simulators, and training aids are also included.

== Technical data ==
Technical Data and Technical Publications consists of scientific or technical information necessary to translate system requirements into discrete engineering and logistic support documentation. Technical data is used in the development of repair manuals, maintenance manuals, user manuals, and other documents that are used to operate or support the system. Technical data includes, but may not be limited to:

- Technical manuals
- Technical and supply bulletins
- Transportability guidance technical manuals
- Maintenance expenditure limits and calibration procedures
- Repair parts and tools lists
- Maintenance allocation charts
- Corrective maintenance instructions
- Preventive maintenance and predictive maintenance instructions
- Drawings/specifications/technical data packages
- Software documentation
- Provisioning documentation
- Depot maintenance work requirements
- Identification lists
- Component lists
- Product support data
- Flight safety critical parts list for aircraft
- Lifting and tie down pamphlet/references
- Hazardous Material documentation

== Computer resources support ==
Computer resources support includes the facilities, hardware, software, documentation, manpower, and personnel needed to operate and support computer systems and the software within those systems. Computer resources include both stand-alone and embedded systems. This element is usually planned, developed, implemented, and monitored by a computer resources working group (CRWG) or computer resources integrated product team (CR-IPT) that documents the approach and tracks progress via a computer resources life-cycle management plan (CRLCMP). Developers will need to ensure that planning actions and strategies contained in the ILSP and CRLCMP are complementary and that computer resources support for the operational software, and ATE software, support software, is available where and when needed.

== Packaging, handling, storage, and transportation (PHS&T) ==
This element includes resources and procedures to ensure that all equipment and support items are preserved, packaged, packed, marked, handled, transported, and stored properly for short- and long-term requirements. It includes material-handling equipment and packaging, handling and storage requirements, and pre-positioning of material and parts. It also includes preservation and packaging level requirements and storage requirements (for example, sensitive, proprietary, and controlled items). This element includes planning and programming the details associated with movement of the system in its shipping configuration to the ultimate destination via transportation modes and networks available and authorized for use. It further encompasses establishment of critical engineering design parameters and constraints (e.g., width, length, height, component and system rating, and weight) that must be considered during system development. Customs requirements, air shipping requirements, rail shipping requirements, container considerations, special movement precautions, mobility, and transportation asset impact of the shipping mode or the contract shipper must be carefully assessed. PHS&T planning must consider:

- System constraints (such as design specifications, item configuration, and safety precautions for hazardous material)
- Special security requirements
- Geographic and environmental restrictions
- Special handling equipment and procedures
- Impact on spare or repair parts storage requirements
- Emerging PHS&T technologies, methods, or procedures and resource-intensive PHS&T procedures
- Environmental impacts and constraints

== Facilities ==
The facilities logistics element is composed of a variety of planning activities, all of which are directed toward ensuring that all required permanent or semi-permanent operating and support facilities (for instance, training, field and depot maintenance, storage, operational, and testing) are available concurrently with system fielding. Planning must be comprehensive and include the need for new construction as well as modifications to existing facilities. It also includes studies to define and establish impacts on life cycle cost, funding requirements, facility locations and improvements, space requirements, environmental impacts, duration or frequency of use, safety and health standards requirements, and security restrictions. Also included are any utility requirements, for both fixed and mobile facilities, with emphasis on limiting requirements of scarce or unique resources.

== Design interface ==
Design interface is the relationship of logistics-related design parameters of the system to its projected or actual support resource requirements. These design parameters are expressed in operational terms rather than as inherent values and specifically relate to system requirements and support costs of the system. Programs such as "design for testability" and "design for discard" must be considered during system design. The basic requirements that need to be considered as part of design interface include:

- Reliability
- Maintainability
- Standardization
- Interoperability
- Safety
- Security
- Usability
- Environmental and hazmat
- Privacy, particularly for computer systems
- Legal

== See also ==
- Reliability, availability and serviceability (RAS)

== Resources ==
- Systems Assessments, Integrated Logistics and COOP Support Services, 26 August 2008
- AeroSpace and Defence (ASD) Industries Association of Europe
- Integrated Logistics Support, The Design Engineering Link by Walter Finkelstein, J.A. Richard Guertin, 1989, ISBN 978-1854230119
