= Backshop =

A backshop or back-shop is a specialized store or workshop found in service industries, such as locomotive and aircraft repair. Most repairs are carried out in small workshops, except where an industrial service is needed.

In the military, backshop repair parts are known as shop-replaceable units (SRUs). These are commonly-stocked subassemblies of a larger system, such as circuit cards components of a line-replaceable unit (LRU), designed to be repaired at the field level. Repair at this level is known as field-level maintenance or intermediate-level (I-level) maintenance. Calibration and repair of United States Air Force test equipment is conducted at shops known as precision measurement equipment laboratories.

== See also ==
- Armory (military)
- Back office
- Railway workshop
