= MTTR =

MTTR may refer to:

- Mean time to repair
- Mean time to recovery
