= Field-replaceable unit =

Modular computer component

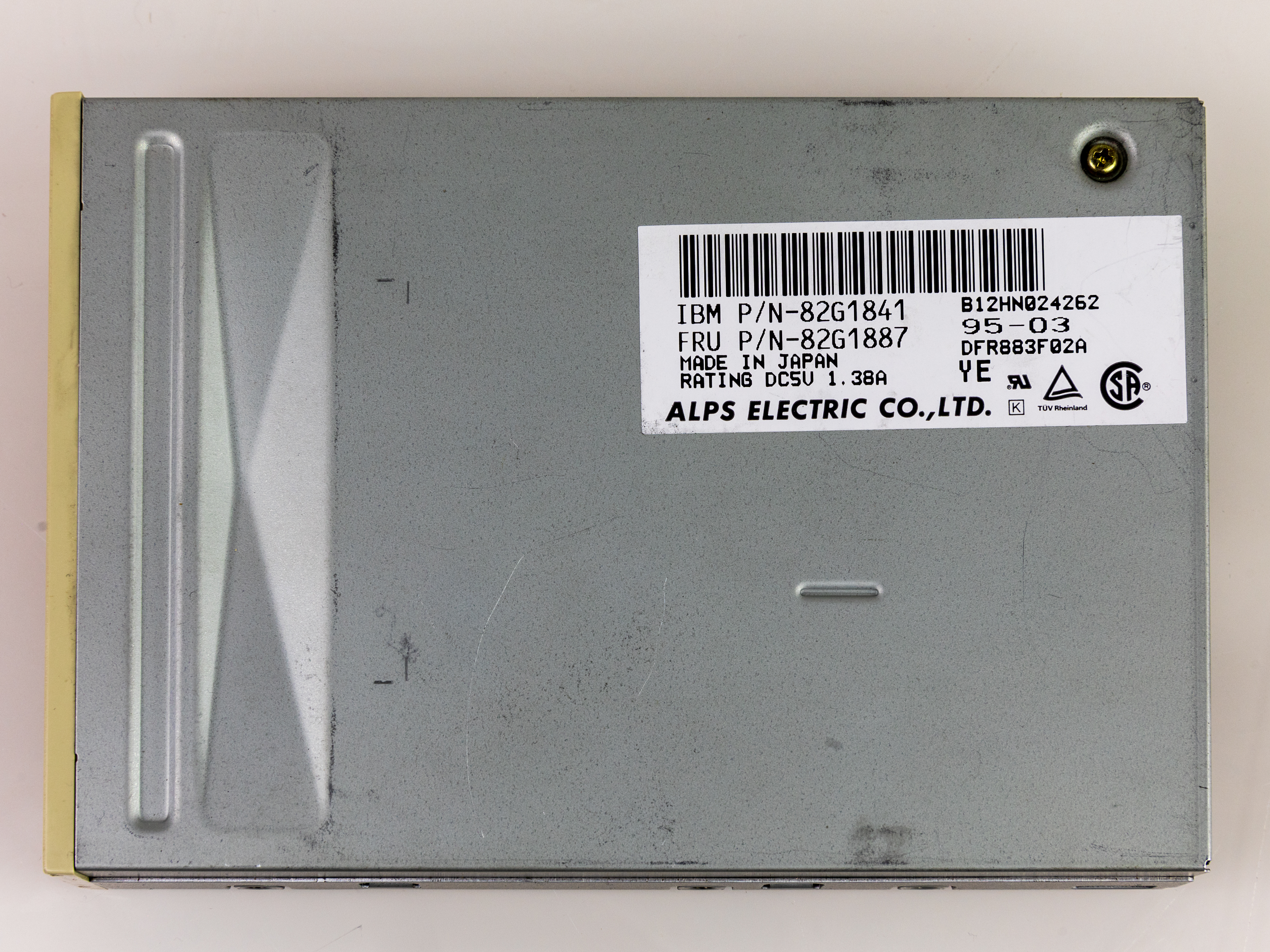
3.5" Floppy disk drive by Alps Electric with FRU number

A field-replaceable unit (FRU) is a printed circuit board, part, or assembly that can be quickly and easily removed from a computer or other piece of electronic equipment, and replaced by the user or a technician without having to send the entire product or system to a repair facility. FRUs allow a technician lacking in-depth product knowledge to isolate faults and replace faulty components. The granularity of FRUs in a system impacts total cost of ownership and support, including the costs of stocking spare parts, where spares are deployed to meet repair time goals, how diagnostic tools are designed and implemented, levels of training for field personnel, whether end-users can do their own FRU replacement, etc.

== Other equipment ==
FRUs are not strictly confined to computers but are also part of many high-end, lower-volume consumer and commercial products. For example, in military aviation, electronic components of line-replaceable units, typically known as shop-replaceable units (SRUs), are repaired at field-service backshops, usually by a "remove and replace" repair procedure, with specialized repair performed at centralized depot or by the OEM.

== History ==
Many vacuum tube computers had FRUs:

- Pluggable units containing one or more vacuum tubes and various passive components

Most transistorized and integrated circuit-based computers had FRUs:

- Computer modules, circuit boards containing discrete transistors and various passive components. Examples:
  - IBM SMS cards
  - DEC System Building Blocks cards
  - DEC Flip-Chip cards
- Circuit boards containing monolithic ICs and/or hybrid ICs, such as IBM SLT cards.

Vacuum tubes themselves are usually FRUs.

For a short period starting in the late 1960s, some television set manufacturers made solid-state televisions with FRUs instead of a single board attached to the chassis. However modern televisions put all the electronics on one large board to reduce manufacturing costs.

== Trends ==
As the sophistication and complexity of multi-replaceable unit electronics in both commercial and consumer industries have increased, many design and manufacturing organizations have expanded the use of the FRU storage device. Storage is no longer limited to simply identification of the FRU itself, but now also comprises back-up copies of critical system information such as system serial numbers, MAC address and even security information. Some systems will fail to function at all without each FRU in the system being ratified at start-up. Today one cannot assume that the FRU storage device is only used to maintain the FRU ID of the part.

== See also ==
- Shop-replaceable unit
- Line-replaceable unit
