= Performance-based contracting =

Procurement strategy that focuses on results

Performance-based contracting (PBC), or results-based contracting, is a procurement strategy used to achieve measurable supplier performance. A PBC approach focuses on developing strategic performance metrics and directly relating contract payments to performance against these metrics. Common metrics include availability, reliability, maintainability, supportability and total cost of ownership.

The primary means of accomplishing this are through incentivized, long-term contracts with specific and measurable levels of operational performance defined by the customer and agreed on by contracting parties. The incentivized performance measures aim to motivate the supplier to implement enhanced practices that offer improved performance and cost effective. This stands in contrast to the conventional transaction-based strategy, where payment is related to completion of milestones and project deliverables.

In PBC, a part or the whole payment is tied to the performance of the provider and the purchaser does not get involved in the details of the process. It therefore becomes crucial to define a clear set of requirements to the provider. Occasionally governments fail to define the requirements clearly. This leaves room for providers, either intentionally or unintentionally, to misinterpret the requirements.

Performance-based approaches are widely used within the defense industry, but can be applied across many sectors. In the defense industry they are also known as performance-based logistics (PBL). In international development the concept is known under output-based aid.

Payment by Results (PbR) is a closely related concept. It can be used as a public policy instrument whereby payments are contingent on the independent verification of results.

== Terminology ==
The terms performance-based and results-based are mostly used interchangeably. The latter may signal more the achievement of broader social and economic outcomes, and "results-based" contracting has also been described as being "simple" to put in place.

Performance-based contracting is the term used in Australia, New Zealand and Canada to describe the practice of attaching contract payment to a set of performance metrics.

Terms that are either synonyms, or at least closely related, include:

- Payment by Results (PbR) is a type of public policy instrument whereby payments are contingent on the independent verification of results.
- Pay for Success, a term used in the United States and related to social impact bond
- Pay for Performance (P4P)
- Performance-based logistics, a term commonly used in the US in the defense sector (and performance-based life-cycle product support, an alternative name for performance-based logistics)
- Contracting for Availability (CfA), a term commonly used in the UK
- Performance based service acquisition
- Outcome Based Contracting.

== Principles ==
Performance-based contracting (PBC) is about buying performance, not transactional goods and services, through an integrated acquisition and logistics process delivering improved capability to a range of products and services. PBC is a support strategy that places primary emphasis on optimising system support to meet the needs of the user. PBCs delineate outcome performance goals, ensure that responsibilities are assigned, provide incentives for attaining these goals, and facilitate the overall life-cycle management of system reliability, supportability, and total ownership costs.

PBC and PbR instruments have three key features:

- Payments for pre-agreed results
- Provider discretion over how the results are achieved
- Independent verification as the trigger for disbursement.

== Implementation ==
Performance-based contracting in practice involves a contracting agency (who are contracting the work to an external provider) and a contractor (who are responsible for completing the work set out in the contract). Several other parties are often involved, including subcontractors, a legal team and consultants. These parties work for both contracting agency and contractor completing various elements of work associated with contract development, contracted work completion or performance management / measurement.

A typical process for implementing a performance-based contract is as follows:

1. Business Case – a document which reviews potential risks, benefits and other potential impacts of a PBC, usually presented to senior managers to aid in their decision making
2. Outcomes – a short statement reflecting the desired result or final deliverable of the contract
3. Measures – define a set of performance measures that collectively measure the organisations performance against the outcome statement
4. Levels – set performance levels for the performance measures, i.e. how well the contractor needs to perform
5. Payment – develop a set of payment curves which set out the pay for performance regime i.e. how much the contractor gets paid for their performance level
6. Incentives – set out a group of incentives that encourage positive behaviours and discourage negative behaviours
7. Contract – draft, review, workshop and finalise a contract which covers all aspects of the performance, payment and terms and conditions of the relationship
8. Review – conduct an analysis of the outcomes of the PBC, taking into account the differing definitions of success from the different groups involved in the contract.

== Benefits ==
There is discussion about the efficacy of PBC as a product support measure. However, there is significant research to suggest that PBC can reduce costs and result in better supplier outputs/performance against metrics than traditional contracting approaches, such as transaction-based contracts.

The U.S. Department of Defense/Air Force/Defense Acquisition University sponsored a research project conducted by the University of Tennessee, looking at the effectiveness of PBC frameworks in defence projects. The study found that projects employing a true PBC framework resulted in substantially lower costs and improved system readiness / capability when compared to non-PBC arrangements. The U.S. Department of Defense has many documented case studies from award-winning PBL contracts.

An analysis in 2015 has suggested that greater benefit is achieved under a PBC strategy where the supplier is a "total service provider" with ownership of the assets being supported.

An international workshop on PBC held in 2014 found both a wide variety of practical applications had been identified for PBC alongside a level of academic interest, but also observed that PBC is "by no means always appropriate".

== Challenges ==
Commissioners (central or local government) may face a number of challenges that may make a pure payment by outcomes approach either impractical or sub-optimal in terms of achieving the aims of PbR models. These challenges largely stem from commissioners’ ability to manage different risks and responsibilities, especially in relation to their understanding of desired outcomes and their measurement.

Challenges of PBC or PbR models can include:

- outcomes only being delivered beyond the provider or investor’s return horizon, meaning an earlier payment or proxy outcome must be used;
- having sufficient confidence that the cash savings used to fund the payment of outcomes will ultimately be realised (e.g. that a reduction in re-offending translates to a reduction in prison capacity);
- finding a contractual solution that ensures transactional costs are reasonable; and
- determining how far the delivery of outcomes is attributable to the actual intervention rather than other services or background factors.
- Commissioners may also find providers are reluctant to accept all of the delivery risk (e.g. where there is a dependency on future government actions or policies) or where government cannot truly transfer all of the delivery risk.

PbR will not always be the optimal contracting model, especially where in-house delivery is more appropriate, or where greater control is required over the service to be delivered.

== Applications ==
Although it was developed in the US for defence applications, and is most actively applied there, PBC strategies are growing in popularity around the world and in industry sectors other than defence. In particular, PBC frameworks are becoming popular in shipping, transport, health services and the energy sector.

=== Defence ===
United States federal law defines performance-based acquisition and treats it as "the preferred method for acquiring services". The National Defense Authorization Act for Fiscal Year 2001 established an order of precedence for:

1. performance-based contracting with firm fixed prices
2. other forms of performance-based contracting
3. non-performance based contracting.

PBC is widely applied in the Australian defence sector, primarily by the major acquisition and support organisation, the former Defence Materiel Organisation (DMO). It is particularly useful in the defence environment because of the inherent complexity and large scale of the projects. Recently, Australian Defence has initiated an escalation of the use of PBCs with the strategic aims of improving capability outcomes and reducing total cost of ownership. In Australia and the US, PBC frameworks are most commonly applied in a defence context.

In October 2000, US Congress approved an incentive for the use of performance-based contracts, through legislation giving the Department of Defense time-limited authority to treat certain performance-based service contracts as contracts for commercial items, which may be awarded using streamlined procedures under Part 12 of the Federal Acquisition Regulation (FAR). The Defense Department issued regulations to implement the legislative authority, but the Government Accountability Office reported in 2003 (at the end of the period of temporary authorisation) that no tracking mechanism had been put in place and therefore the Department did not know "the extent to which the authority [had] been used". Defense officials estimated that use had been "limited, at best".

PBC frameworks are currently being used in numerous defence-related projects, including:

- BAE Systems Hawk
- Boeing Defense, Space & Security
- Eurofighter Typhoon
- Anzac class frigates
- Royal Australian Armoured Corps vehicles
- Collins class submarines
- GE Aviation
- Lockheed Martin: F-35 Lightning II maintenance contracts "pave the way for a longer-term, Performance Based Logistics agreement for the F-35 program".

=== Industry ===
PBC is becoming more popular in a broader range of private and public sector organisations as they seek to reduce costs and create a closer link between expenditure and performance goals.

Areas in industry where PBC is applied include:

- Commercial shipping
- Public transport
- Health services, where the term "pay for performance" is also used
- Energy generation
- Maintenance, repair and overhaul
- Commercial airlines
- Manufacturing
- IT and business process outsourcing (BPO)
- Facilities management
- Road maintenance, for example in Western Australia and New South Wales. In both instances, very positive outcomes are recorded. Another case study related to Performance Based Contracting in Road Maintenance claims that in 2005, 35 countries were employing PBC for Road Maintenance, and in 2006 15 others had implemented a PBC or were investigating its use.

=== Domestic policy ===
There are many cases of Payment by Results (PbR) models being used to achieve domestic policy goals, in particular the delivery of social or community services, with payments linked to the results a provider achieves, rather than its inputs and processes. The use of PbR models is often promoted as a way to drive service improvements and achieve increased value for money by aligning incentives to desired outcomes.

In practice, a diverse range of PbR models have been implemented by governments, varying by the degree to which payments can be based on the achievement of pure outcomes, and risk can be transferred away from government and towards providers.

The purest form of PbR is payment by outcomes, which seeks to maximise payments linked to outcomes. This is where the commissioner (central or local government) is fully able to contract in terms of the outcomes it wants and to transfer the financial risk of non-delivery to providers.

The Conservative Party in the UK, in its 2010 general election manifesto, proposed to introduce "simple results-based contracts drawn up with central government and its agencies", which would allow former public sector staff to operate their own public services.

=== International development ===
Performance-based contracting is used in international development as part of output-based aid approaches. In this context, the approach is often referred to as results-based aid (where the funding relationship is between a donor and a recipient country) or results-based financing (where the funding relationship is between a developing country government or a development agency, and public or private sector providers).
