= MTFF =

MTFF can refer to:

- mean time to first failure, a concept in reliability engineering
- Man-Tended Free Flyer, an abandoned plan for an ESA space station
