= MTTFd =

Mean Time to Dangerous Failure. In a safety system MTTF_{D} is the portion of failure modes that can lead to failures that may result in hazards to personnel, environment or equipment.

MTTF_{D} is critical to the determination of the performance level of a safety system. ISO 13849 defines three levels of MTTF_{D}:

Level achieved by channel	Range of each channel
Low	3 years ≤ MTTF_{D} < 10 years
Medium	10 years ≤ MTTF_{D} < 30 years
High	30 years ≤ MTTF_{D} ≤ 100 years

ISO 13849 prescribes three methods to determine the MTTF_{D} of a safety channel:

1. use the manufacturer's failure data;
2. use the methods prescribed in Annexes C and D of ISO 13849-1
3. use 10 years (i.e. assume the channel has low integrity)

Mean Time to Failure (MTTF) is assumed constant during the useful life period of a component. The MTTF can be calculated according to:

$$\text{MTTF} = \frac{1}{\lambda}[hours] \!$$

where λ is the failure rate for the component.

The relationship between MTBF and MTTF is expressed as:

$$\text{MTBF} = MTTF + MTTR \!$$

where MTTR is the mean time to repair.

The MTTF of a system is the sum of MTTF_{S} and MTTF_{D}. To understand the relationship between MTTF_{S} and MTTF_{D} consider the case of a switch that turns a motor on or off. The switch has two failure modes: the switch can fail stuck closed or the switch can fail stuck open. If the switch fails stuck open, the motor will never energize; as a result, the motor will not create any hazards due to its operation. In contrast, if the switch fails stuck closed, this failure can lead to a dangerous situation like for example the case where the operator needs to stop the motor, but the motor will not stop because the switch is stuck in the closed position. The failure mode where the switch is stuck in the open position is denominated the safe failure mode, whereas the stuck closed failure mode is denominated the dangerous failure mode. The likelihood of occurrence of a dangerous or safe failure may differ and is a function of several variables in the construction and design of a component. A poorly designed switch may have a higher proportion of dangerous failures (thus a lower MTTF_{D}), whereas switches rated for use in safety circuits may very well preclude the occurrence of stuck closed failure modes (thus have infinite or very high MTTF_{D}). Assessing the performance level of a safety system, requires knowing the distribution of the dangerous vs. safe failure modes of its components and ultimately a determination of its MTTF_{D}.
