= PMEL =

PMEL may refer to:

- Pacific Marine Environmental Laboratory
- Precision measurement equipment laboratory
- Premelanosome protein
