= Mean time to first failure =

Average service life for non-repairable components

Mean time (to) first failure (MTFF, sometimes MTTFF) is a concept in reliability engineering, which describes time to failure for non-repairable components like an integrated circuit soldered on a circuit board. For repairable components like a replaceable light bulb the concept of mean time between failures is used to describe the failure rate.

MTFF and MTTF (mean time to failure) have identical meanings. The key is that this is a non-repairable and non-recoverable failure. For example, the failure of a TV typically isn't measured by this criterion because the TV can be repaired. However, if this failure was due to a burned out integrated circuit, that circuit itself can't be repaired and must be replaced. The failure of that circuit is measured by mean time to failure. It's generally used to predict the first failure after manufacturing.
