= Frames per stop =

Term of reliability in the bowling industry

Frames per stop is a term used in the bowling industry by technicians, manufacturers, and others involved in this recreation industry. The term refers to how many frames, on average, a group of pinsetters is able to operate without a stop, which is a malfunction or other condition which requires human assistance to fix the machine.

== See also ==
- Mean time between failures – Predicted elapsed time between inherent failures of a system during operation
