= Logistics center =

Hub for logistics

A logistics center, logistics centre, or depot is a geographically defined area which supports a range of activities related to the transport, logistics, and distribution of goods. Operators may own or lease facilities such as warehouses, distribution centers, and service areas, and the site is typically equipped with the infrastructure and services necessary to support such operations.

== See also ==
- Precision measurement equipment laboratory
- Distribution center
