= Output-based aid =

Output-based aid (OBA) (or results-based aid) refers to development aid strategies that link the delivery of public services in developing countries to targeted performance-related subsidies. OBA subsidies are offered in transport construction, education, water and sanitation systems, and healthcare among other sectors where positive externalities exceed cost recovery exclusively from private markets. OBA is a form of results-based financing, with similar principles as performance-based contracting.

Interest in OBA and results-based financing in the international development sector is growing. In healthcare, OBA is often implemented by contracting providers in either the public or private sector, sometimes both, and issuing vouchers to people considered at higher risk of disease or in greater need of the health services. OBA (in the form of results-based contracts) is also used for rural water supply in Africa.

One of the origins and drivers of the OBA concept was in 2002, when the World Bank Group launched its Private Sector Development Strategy (PSD), of which OBA was a key component. The World Bank has been the most active participant in OBA. In 2003, along with the UK's Department for International Development (DFID), they launched the "Global Partnership on Output-Based Aid" (GPOBA), later renamed to "Global Partnership for Results-Based Approaches" (GPRBA). The reason for the change of name was because the partnership "broadened its mandate in 2019 to incorporate more flexible financing solutions beyond OBA".

== Definition and terminology ==
According to the World Bank Group, Output-based Aid (OBA) is defined as follows: "Output-based Aid is a form of RBF (results-based financing) designed to deliver access to infrastructure and social services for the poor. Service delivery is contracted out to a third party—public or private—that receives a subsidy to complement or replace the required user contribution."

As part of the process of OBA, "the service provider is responsible for pre-financing the project, and is reimbursed after the services have been delivered and independently verified."

=== Related terms ===
A similar term is payment by results (PbR) which is also used to describe the principles of OBA. In general terms, PbR is a type of public policy instrument whereby payments are contingent on the independent verification of results.

Results-based aid is concerned with incentivizing national-level outcomes and involves the linking of ODA (e.g. from bilateral or multilateral development agencies to developing country governments) to verifiable results, such as performance against one or more outcome indicators, or the successful implementation of a government program. Possible outcomes might include number of children passing an exam, an improvement in the infant mortality rate, or the number of people with a defined improvement in access to energy.

Results-based financing is concerned with the delivery of national or sub-national outputs, and could be used by developing country governments (national or local), public agencies, or development agencies as incentive for the provision of goods or services, create or expand markets, or stimulate innovation. Possible target outputs might include the number of vaccines administered, the number of teachers that are trained, the number of new electricity connections that are provided in a defined area. Results-based financing includes approaches such as output-based aid (OBA).

== Overview ==
OBA is specifically targeted for individuals in developing countries who lack the financial means to pay for basic services. The service provider will receive subsidies to replace costs associated with providing the service to people, such as user fees. Individual agents will verify that the service is being delivered and based on the performance of the service-provider, a subsidy will be granted. That is how it is "performance-based".

OBA links disbursement to results. It is an alternative to the majority official development assistance (ODA), which is generally provided as grants, loans and guarantees, and is therefore disbursed in advance of delivery. OBA seek to provide incentives for the achievement of both outcomes and outputs by developing country governments, public agencies, commercial operators and civil society organizations.

OBA generally works through a private firm, or another third party, acting as the service provider. The service provider is responsible for the initial financing of the project and, only after results have been verified, will the firm receive subsidies from a donor. In such schemes, it is the provider who bears the risk of loss, rather than the aid donor, and output-based schemes allow for the tracking of results because of the way they function. Integration of the private sector into aid schemes is common with OBA, since they often provide the initial financing. The World Bank sees OBA as a way to improve aid effectiveness. This differs from traditional aid schemes that will usually focus on the inputs to service providers rather than the outputs. The donor is usually the World Bank, a government or an international organization or philanthropist that is part of the OBA scheme. Subsidies from a donor will generally serve to complement or reduce user fees. The subsidy is paid only after the particular service has been delivered to a community. The subsidies are targeted to poorer individuals, since OBA initiatives are carried out in regions with significant amounts of poverty.

In healthcare, vouchers are granted to patients who require medical attention and cannot afford or access it. These vouchers can be taken to hospitals or clinics, whether private or public, and they will be provided with the medical attention they require. The clinic or healthcare professional that provided the medical service will be subsidized for the delivery of the service by a donor.

== Advantages ==
According to the GPOBA, OBA improves upon other forms of aid in a number of ways. The first is by creating transparency since the provider and receiver of any subsidy will be known to each other and the public. Performance risk is shifted to the providers in OBA schemes since they are accountable for what they deliver. OBA schemes are said to provide incentives for innovation in projects as well as a means for mobilizing expertise and finance from the private sector. Finally, OBA provides internal tracking of results.

Malcolm Potts of the University of California, Berkeley believes OBA schemes to be more effective than traditional aid projects because they invest in extant infrastructure. OBA schemes can provide poor consumers with the leverage to determine the quality of the service they are provided with. For example, in a health-care project, individuals receiving OBA will gain choice in where they want to go for their health care needs, essentially a choice between options in the public and private sector. With OBA, existing service providers are granted subsidies based on the number of people who use their services. In this way an individual can choose between multiple service providers, whether public, private or non-governmental, and only after the service has been provided do they receive the subsidy.

Compared to other aid schemes where projects were pre-funded by a donor, OBA uses explicit funding; if service providers fail to deliver, they and their investors, rather than taxpayers, who bear the brunt of financial loss.

Proponents of OBA argue that this approach is more likely to deliver the desired development objective, with less scope for waste and greater freedom and incentive for the beneficiary to innovate or achieve the desired objective at least cost.

== Problem areas ==
OBA schemes have been criticized for their high administrative costs which exist for a number of reasons. The printing and distribution of vouchers can be costly. Also, there is significant cost in effectively monitoring outcomes of OBA schemes, and maintaining a process of transparency in OBA. Voucher theft or counterfeiting could be a serious issue for OBA projects. The sale on vouchers on the black market could easily disrupt the knowledge of where vouchers are distributed.

Possible criticisms include the need for recipients to obtain pre-financing, the risk of unintended consequences, higher monitoring and verification costs, and the difficulty of setting the incentive at the optimum level.

Performance-based conditionality has come under criticism for producing intermediate indicators which often distort the achievements of particular projects. These indicators, which only convey the success of certain actors and which are susceptible to manipulation, do not provide accurate indication of long-term changes of benefit to a region. Progress should be measured in more long-term objectives which encompass many sectors that contribute to the well-being of a population. For example, reducing child mortality requires many areas—health care, family planning and clean water—to be targeted, and even though intermediate indicators of an OBA scheme in one sector may appear positive, this does not necessarily identify progress in reducing child mortality.

The Private Sector Development Strategy which OBA is included in has come under heavy criticism for many of the same reasons the World Bank has been criticized for its work in the past as well as many new criticisms of the strategy itself. In response, it has been criticized for ignoring the many dimensions of poverty and not defining well how the "poor" would benefit from market interventions. The idea that private sector development and OBA will "shift risk" to private-sector service providers has been criticized since many private groups are risk averse when it comes to making a profit and thus would be hesitant in taking on projects lacking a guaranteed payoff.

Professor Robert Wade, of the London School of Economics, said in an article that the PSD strategy is: "A continuation of previous Bank policies to reduce the state to a coordination and regulation role, leaving private companies to organise production and service delivery."

Much aid is tied to conditionality and, even though OBA rewards performance, it will mainly reward performance in the private sector. The PSD strategy looks to the private sector to develop infrastructure that will benefit the poor. An issue that many multinational corporations will receive some of the funding for OBAs has not been dealt with very well by the World Bank. Not only does this allow them to further their economic control of infrastructure in poorer nations, they are also able to avoid many of the risks of OBA through various agreements and by passing on some of the costs to the state and the taxpayers. For example, the lease for a Guinea water infrastructure OBA project "allowed the MNC to protect itself against cost increases by passing them on, with the government regulator unable to force the MNC to disclose enough information to judge the reasonableness of the requests."

Privatizing basic services is a contentious issue because contracting out service provision to private firms may be detrimental to universal service provision. Private firms look to make a profit, and if this is their primary motive then universal access becomes less of a priority. Accountability to state services may deteriorate. Many critics have noted that in developed countries, the state is responsible for basic services that the World Bank wants private firms to provide in developing countries. UNICEF, in a study entitled "Basic Services for All: Public Spending and the Social Dimensions of Poverty", laid out moral, consensual, instrumental and historical grounds, arguing that state provision of basic services is mandatory regardless of circumstance.

Output-based approaches generally will rely on a well-established market, something that is not present in many developing countries. The regulatory and institutional mechanisms of the market are almost non-existent in many nations where OBA is used, and this does not allow domestic firms to compete on level ground with foreign firms. Sarah Anderson of the Institute for Policy Studies said that many grassroots and community organizations will not have the means to provide initial financing for service projects. They will be unable to sustain themselves until they get a subsidy for their performance. Rather, global firms that are already well established will more likely get OBA contracts, and in the process many local organization will no longer be part of the scheme.

== History ==
The first instance of voucher-based OBA was in South Korea and Taiwan in the 1960s. According to Malcolm Potts, these family-planning initiatives were very successful. There were few such instances where OBA was used for development purposes up until the new millennium. Voucher-based healthcare schemes were piloted in Latin America, Asia and Africa in the 1990s and early 2000s.

In 2002, the World Bank launched its Private Sector Development Strategy (PSD), of which OBA was a key component. The World Bank has been the most active participant in OBA. In 2003, along with the UK's Department for International Development (DFID), they launched the "Global Partnership on Output-Based Aid" (GPOBA), later renamed to "Global Partnership for Results-Based Approaches" (GPRBA). The reason for the change of name was because the partnership "broadened its mandate in 2019 to incorporate more flexible financing solutions beyond OBA". GPRBA exists to create "financial incentives for service providers to extend basic services specifically to low-income communities, while also providing incentives for consumers in these communities to access the services". The partnership has worked with various international partners to pursue output-based initiatives in fields of healthcare, water, energy, transport, telecommunications and education. Regarding the number and size of supported projects GPRBA states that: "As of June 30, 2023, the GPRBA portfolio consists of 58 projects in 7 sectors, spanning 30 countries and 1 territory, for a total grant commitment of $304 million and cumulative disbursements of $233.6 million."

== Examples ==
Interest in OBA and results-based financing in the international development sector is growing. The UK Department for International Development is piloting "cash on delivery aid" (a form of results-based aid) and results-based financing programs in a number of countries. The World Bank has launched the program-for-results financing in 2011, a new results-based lending instrument, and the EU is exploring results-based approaches for the aid component of the multi-annual financial framework from 2014.

=== Healthcare ===
In healthcare, OBA is often implemented by contracting providers in either the public or private sector, sometimes both, and issuing vouchers to people considered at higher risk of disease or in greater need of the health services. Two of the earliest examples of competitive vouchers and fee-for-service contracts in healthcare were implemented in South Korea and Taiwan in the 1960s. In Nicaragua, the Instituto CentroAmericano de la Salud (Central American Health Institute) began voucher programs for reproductive and sexual health services in 1995. New programs for facility-based maternal deliveries in Kenya and Uganda began in 2006 and 2009 respectively.

=== Information technology ===
In Mongolia projects to improve rural telecommunications have been undertaken. Existing communication operators bid for subsidy contracts to expand their networks and services to rural areas with poor access to telecommunications. The bidding operators were also aware of the risk associated with the subsidies, since they would only receive funding if certain outcomes had been met. These OBA schemes are meant to provide universal Internet access to the internet.

=== Rural water supply ===
Performance-based service delivery models for rural water supply have emerged in Africa despite the unfavourable institutional environment. Researchers proposed policy recommendations to improve access to safe drinking water in rural Africa. One of them is to design and test performance-based funding models at national and regional scales. This is similar to the payment-by-results scheme that the OBA approach uses.

For example, the Uptime Catalyst Facility, a UK-registered charity, delivers global rural water services through results-based contracts (RBCs). It issues grants ranging from $5,000 to $400,000 per year to rural water maintenance providers. Uptime works with more than 12 providers in 12 countries to bring sustainable drinking water supply to 1.5 million rural people. Indicators for measuring results are mainly based on reliability of the water systems’ availability and volumes disbursed. At a later stage, Uptime Catalyst Facility plans to turn this pilot work into a public-financing model in Africa, Asia and Latin America. In 2024, the Uptime Catalyst Facility expects to disburse "USD 3 million through RBCs linked to reliable drinking water services for c. 5 million people who pay a share of service operating costs".

Corporates and philanthropy can also take part in results-based contracts for water supply as part of their commitments to ESG (Environmental, social, and governance) and CSR (Corporate social responsibility). These kinds of contracts have reduced uncertainty and risk for the funder because the funder only pays for drinking water delivered by a professional implementer after the results have been verified. For this to work well, a data integrity system is needed. The water users pay tariffs which provides co-funding. Performance metrics for these results-based contracts are related to "quantity, quality, affordability, reliability and proximity".

Digital technologies can be used for innovative financing mechanisms in utilities sectors in Africa and Asia, such as results-based finance (RBF) mechanisms that are digitally-verified. In these schemes, "grant disbursements [are] premised at least in part on automated verification of performance indicators through digital verification, for example leveraging sensors or metering data".

== See also ==
- Performance-based contracting
