= Mean down time =

In organizational management, mean down time (MDT) is the average time that a system is non-operational. This includes all downtime associated with repair, corrective and preventive maintenance, self-imposed downtime, and any logistics or administrative delays.

== Description ==
The inclusion of delay times distinguishes mean down time from mean time to repair (MTTR), which includes only downtime specifically attributable to repairs.

Mean Down Time key factors:

1. SYSTEM FAILURE
  1. Identification & Recovery Time. First, the fact that the system is down must be identified, and maintainers notified & brought to action
  2. Fault detection and isolation. The problem must be identified and the faulty part identified.
  3. Parts Procurement. Replacement parts needed (if any) must be obtained
  4. System Repair. Faulty parts must be replaced or repaired.
2. SCHEDULED DOWNTIME
  1. Preventive Maintenance. Preventive maintenance checks are often intrusive and require the system to be down (unless prognostics are used), e.g., checking oil in a car engine.
  2. System Upgrade. System downtime is usually required to bring new features to the system.
  3. Calibration. Many forms of mechanical or electronic equipment require periodic intrusive calibration.
  4. Other administrative actions

There are four main ways of reducing MDT:

1. Design the system to fail less often. A more reliable system that doesn't fail often reduces the Down Time.
2. Make the system repairable. If an item is repairable, it will be used for a longer time, and the user will become more familiar with its operation. This will decrease the MDT because the user will be able to detect abnormal operation sooner, and the system will be repaired before the problem becomes too serious.
3. Let the user repair the system. By designing a system to be user-repairable, the MDT will be considerably decreased, as it will not have to be taken out of service for long periods of time while it is being repaired by the manufacturer (which of course includes time spent in transit to and from the manufacturer).
4. Provide the user with a repair support system. The closer critical spare parts are to the system, the faster it will be able to be repaired, as this eliminates the delay involved in ordering parts from the manufacturer and waiting to receive them. Also, the clarity of any instructions on how to repair an item will greatly contribute to the speed at which it is repaired.
