= Line-replaceable unit =

Modular component designed to be replaced quickly at an operating location

A line-replaceable unit (LRU), lower line-replaceable unit (LLRU), line-replaceable component (LRC), or line-replaceable item (LRI) is a modular component of an airplane, ship or spacecraft (or any other manufactured device) that is designed to be replaced quickly at an operating location (1st line). The different lines (distances) are essential for logistics planning and operation. An LRU is usually a sealed unit such as a radio or other auxiliary equipment. LRUs are typically assigned logistics control numbers (LCNs) or work unit codes (WUCs) to manage logistics operations.

LRUs can improve maintenance operations, because they can be stocked and replaced quickly from distributed nearby on-site inventories (sometimes mobile storage), restoring the mobile systems to service, while the failed (unserviceable) LRU is undergoing complicated repair and overhaul actions in other support locations (lines). Because of their modularity, LRUs also can contribute reducing system costs and increase quality, by centralizing development across different models of vehicles.

LRUs are similar in nature to shop-replaceable units (SRUs), but rather than being component functions, represent complete functional units.

== Definition ==
While the term LRU has been in use for decades, MIL-PRF-49506, Notice 1 of 18 Jan 05, the Performance Spec for Logistics Management Information defines an LRU as:

An LRU is an essential support item which is removed and replaced at the field level to restore the end item to an operational ready condition. Conversely, a non-LRU is a part, component, or assembly used in the repair of an LRU / LLRU, when the LRU has failed and has been removed from the end item for repair.

An LLRU is part of an LRU, and which can be removed and replaced at the field level to restore its LRU to an operational ready condition. As an LRU is considered the 'parent', the LLRU is considered a 'child'. An LLRU can also be a child of a child--that is, an LLRU being a component of a higher-level LLRU. However, there is no hierarchy difference between child levels; the only hierarchical separation is parent versus child.

== Specifications ==
LRUs are designed to specifications to assure that they can be interchanged, especially if they are from different manufacturers. Usually a class of LRUs will have coordinated environmental specifications (i.e. temperature, condensation, etc.). However, each particular LRU will also have detailed specifications describing its function, tray size, tray connectors, attachment points, weight ranges, etc. It is common for LRU trays to have standardized connections for rapid mounting, cooling air, power, and grounding. The mounting hardware is often manually removable standard-screw-detent quick-release fittings. Front-mounted electrical connectors are often jacks for ring-locked cannon plugs that can be removed and replaced (R&R) without tools. Specifications also define the supporting tools necessary to remove and replace the unit. Many require no tools, or a standard-sized Frearson screwdriver. Frearson is specified for some vehicles and many marine systems because Frearson screws keep their mating screwdriver from camming out, and the same screwdriver can be used on many sizes of screws. Most LRUs also have handles, and specific requirements for their bulk and weight. LRUs typically need to be "transportable" and fit through a door or hatchway. There are also requirements for flammability, unwanted radio emissions, resistance to damage from fungus, static electricity, heat, pressure, humidity, condensation drips, vibration, radiation, and other environmental measurements.

LRUs may be designed to ARINC 700-series standards. The form factor of LRUs comply to ARINC Standards, ARINC 404 and ARINC 600. LRUs are also defined by manufacturers like Airbus and Boeing and by various military organizations. In the military, electronic LRUs are typically designed to interface according to data bus standards such as MIL-STD-1553. On the International Space Station, LRUs are referred to as orbit-replaceable units.

== See also ==
- Aircraft maintenance
- Avionics
- Level of repair analysis
- Maintenance, repair, and operations
- Spare part
- Shop-replaceable unit
- Field-replaceable unit
