= Logistics support analysis =

Logistics support analysis (LSA) is a structured approach to increase efficiency of maintenance and reduces the cost of providing support by pre-planning all aspects of integrated logistics support. A successful LSA will define those support requirements that are ideal for the system design.

The logistic support analysis (LSA) is one of the most important processes of product support. It is the principal tool to design the products relevant to maintainability, reliability, testability and to optimize life cycle cost as well as to define all required resources to support the product in its intended use, during in-service operation

== History ==
Going back to the late 1950s, there was maintenance task analysis (MTA), maintenance engineering analysis (MEA), maintenance engineering analysis data system (MEADS), maintenance analysis data system (MADS), maintenance level analysis (MLA), maintenance engineering analysis records (MEARS), end item maintenance sheets (EIMS), logistic support analysis (LSA), and now product support analysis (PSA).

Logistics support analysis was codified into a military standard in 1973 with the publication of Military Standard 1388–1. Logistic support analysis (LSA) guidelines and requirements were established by Department of Defense (DOD) Instruction 5000.2, Major System Acquisition Procedures, and DOD Directive 5000.39, Acquisition and Management of Integrated Logistic Support for Systems and Equipment, to create a single, uniform approach by the military services to improve supportability of military weapon systems through a disciplined approach to defining the required operational support other integrated logistic support (ILS) objectives during the acquisition development phase. 1388-1A was updated in 1983 and 1991 before being downgraded from a standard to a best practice on 26 November 1996. 1388-2A was updated in 1991 and 1993, and was also cancelled as a standard in 1996. The definitions for the database records of LSA were established by the Logistics Support Analysis Record, MIL-STD-1388-2A, on 20 JULY 84.

In 1986, the US Army began to transform the paper-intensive LSAR into a desktop application known as computer-aided logistics support (CALS). The Navy began a similar effort in 1987. In 1991, the programs were combined and expanded to all services under the name Joint CALS (JCALS). JCALS was approved for use in August 1998.

In 1996, as part of the OSD Mandate For Change, MIL-STD-1388 was cancelled. It was briefly replaced by MIL-PRF-49506 while a "civilian" replacement was being sought.

Alternative military specifications from other countries appeared as a replacement for MIL-STD-1388, namely DEF STAN 00-60 by the Ministry of Defence (United Kingdom) in 1998 (later replaced by DEF STAN 00-600 in 2010) or DEF (AUST) 5692 by the Australian Department of Defence in 2003. These military specifications had only limited distribution (typically only in their own countries) and MIL-STD-1388 was still requested by many military procurement contracts in different countries even after its cancellation.

Due to the disappearance of MIL-STD-1388, two "civilian" initiatives appeared to replace the LSA process. One was developed within the framework of the Government Electronics and Information Technology Association (GEIA), which lead to the publication of GEIA-STD-0007, and associated GEIA-HB-0007 by the SAE International in 2007. The second one was the S3000L, published by the Aerospace and Defence Industries Association of Europe in 2010. While the GEIA specification is mainly used in the US and only for military programs, S3000L has been more widely adopted, mainly in Europe, but also outside it for both civilian and military projects.

== MIL-STD-1388 structure ==
As originally envisioned, the LSA data was structured as a LSA record (LSAR), as defined by MIL-STD-1388-1A (records) and MIL-STD-1388-2A (outputs)

Tasks:

100	Programming, planning and control
200	Mission and support system definition
300	Preparation and evaluation of alternatives
400	Determine logistics support resource requirements
500	Supportability assessment

LSAR output was structured as:

15 Data records
115 Date cards
547 Data elements
80 STD report formats
104 Relational tables
518 Data elements
48 STD report formats

A similar structure was used by DEF STAN 00-60 and DEF (AUST) 5692.

== See also ==
- Level of repair analysis
- Logistics management
- Military acquisition
- Military logistics
- Product life cycle management
- Blanchard, Benjamin S. Logistic Engineering and Management Publication Date: 10 March 1998 | ISBN 0139053166 | ISBN 978-0139053160 | Editor's review: An authoritative exploration of logistics management within the engineering design and development process, this book concentrates on the design, sustaining maintenance and support of "systems." Deals with " logistics" from a total "systems/life cycle" perspective" and includes those activities associated with the determination of requirements, the design, development, production, utilization, sustaining maintenance and support, and retirement of systems." Emphasizes the importance of addressing logistics in the early phases of the system life cycle, including: design engineering aspects and design of systems for supportability.
- Frohne, Philip T. Quantitative Measurements for Logistics Publication Date: December 2008 | ISBN 0071494154 | ISBN 978-0071494151 | Editor's review: Logistics Support Analysis (LSA) is the processes of collecting and analyzing all of the Integrated Logistics Support (ILS) data involved with supporting a system or component from the conceptual design, through design development, manufacturing, distributing, operation, phase-out, and disposal.
