= Consumables =

Goods intended to be used up

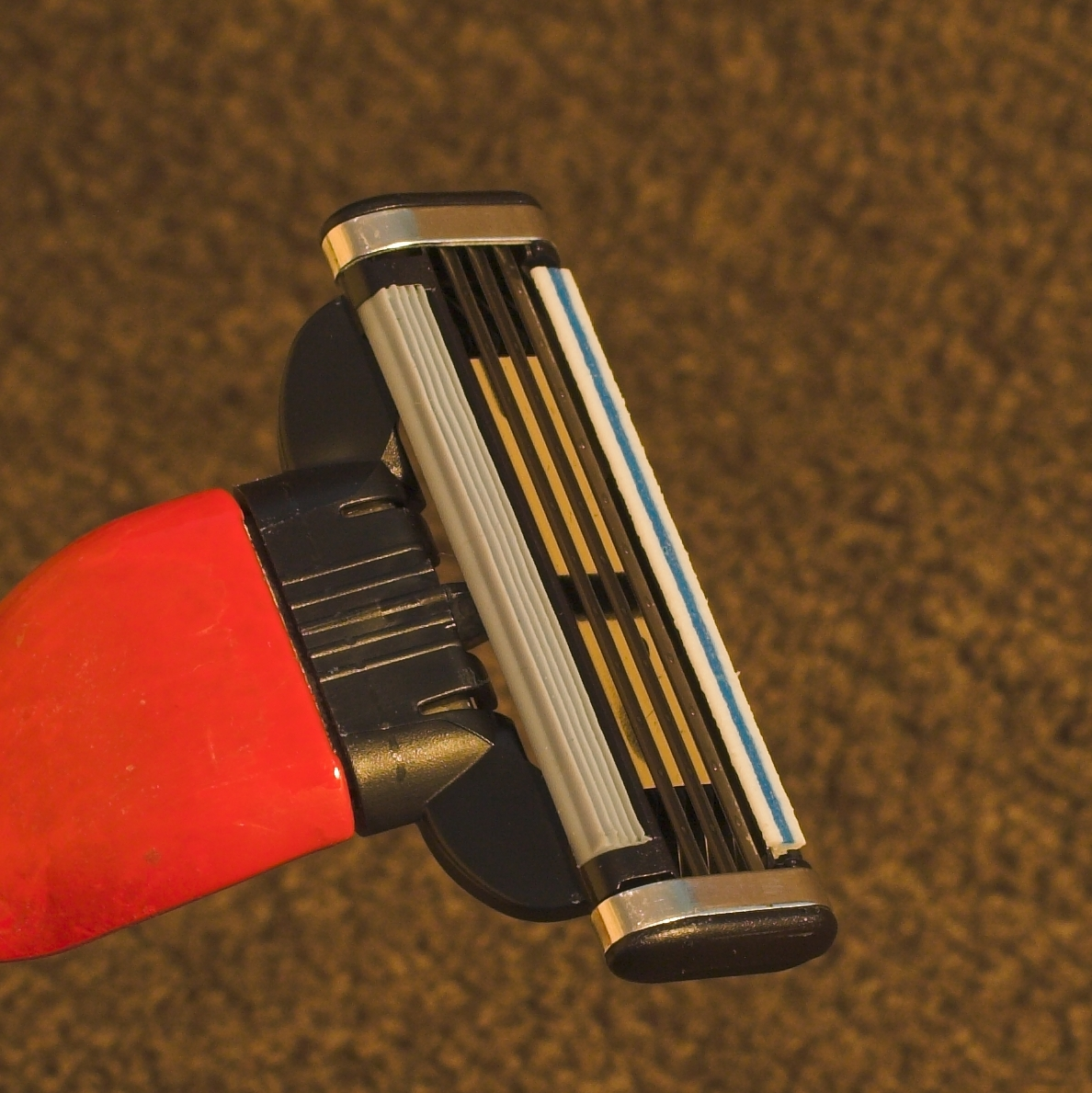
With this razor blade mounted on a handle, the razor blade head is a consumable good which is disposed after several shaves. The head clicks onto the handle, which is a long-lasting durable good.

Consumables are goods that are intended to be used up, or in the case of food, eaten. People have, for example, always consumed food and water. Consumables are in contrast to long-lasting durable goods such as cars and washing machines. Disposable products are a particular, extreme case of consumables, because their end-of-life is reached after a single use.

Consumables are products that consumers use recurrently, i.e., items which "get used up" or discarded. For example, consumable office supplies are such products as paper, pens, file folders, Post-it notes, and toner or ink cartridges. This is in contrast to capital goods or durable goods in the office, such as computers, fax machines, and other business machines or office furniture. Sometimes a company sells a durable good at an attractively low price in the hopes that the consumer will then buy the consumables that go with it at a price providing a higher margin. Printers and ink cartridges are an example, as are cameras and film as well as razors and blades, which gave this business model its usual name (the razor and blades model).

Printing consumables include items like toner cartridges, which are consumed, utilized and then exhausted. These supplies are considered to be a major element of printing process.

For arc welding one uses a consumable electrode. This is an electrode that conducts electricity to the arc but also melts into the weld as a filler metal.

Consumable goods are often excluded from warranty policies, as it is considered that covering them would excessively increase the cost of the premium.

== Terminology ==
They are also known as consumable goods, non-durable goods, or soft goods.

== Business model ==
The "razor and blades business model" is a business model in which one item is sold at a low price (or given away) in order to increase sales of a complementary good, such as consumable supplies. While the model is named after razors, it applies to any business model using a durable item that needs consumable parts. It is different from loss leader marketing and product sample marketing, which do not depend on complementary products or services. Common examples of the razor and blades model include inkjet printers whose ink cartridges are significantly marked up in price, coffee machines that use single-use coffee pods, electric toothbrushes, and video game consoles which require additional purchases to obtain accessories and software not included in the original package.

Although the concept and the catchphrase "Give 'em the razor; sell 'em the blades" are widely credited to King Camp Gillette, the inventor of the safety razor, Gillette did not in fact follow this model.

== See also ==
- Durability
- Durable good
- Fast-moving consumer goods
- Principles of intelligent urbanism
- Repairable component
