= Aircraft maintenance =

Co-ordinated pre-planned tasks which maintain an aircraft's airworthiness

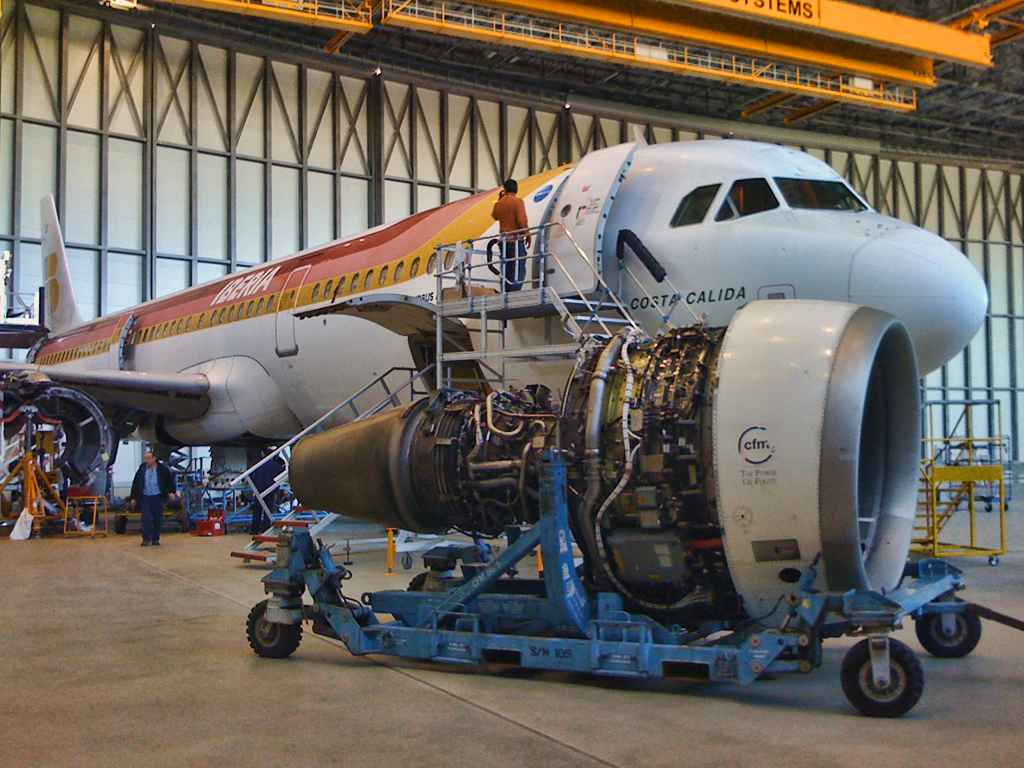
An Airbus A321 from Iberia having its CFM56 engine changed.

Aircraft maintenance is the operation and completion of scheduled, co-ordinated and pre-planned series of tasks required to ensure the continuing airworthiness of an aircraft or aircraft part; including overhaul, inspection, replacement, defect rectification, and the embodiment of modifications, compliance with airworthiness directives and repair.

== Regulation ==
The maintenance of aircraft is highly regulated, in order to ensure safe and correct functioning during flight. In civil aviation national regulations are coordinated under international standards, established by the International Civil Aviation Organization (ICAO). The ICAO standards have to be implemented by local airworthiness authorities to regulate the maintenance tasks, personnel and inspection system. Maintenance staff must be licensed for the tasks they carry out.

Major airworthiness regulatory authorities include the US Federal Aviation Administration (FAA), European Union Aviation Safety Agency (EASA), Civil Aviation Safety Authority (CASA) from Australia, Civil Aviation Administration of China (CAAC), Directorate General Of Civil Aviation (DGCA) of India.

== Aircraft maintenance organization ==
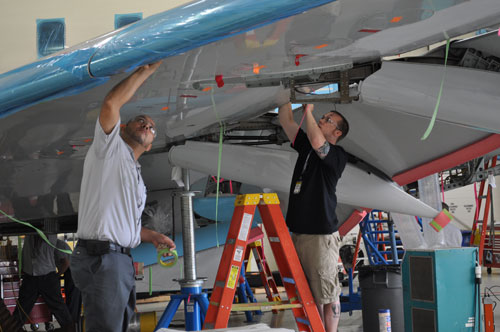
Technicians work on a Bombardier airplane in Dallas, Texas.

=== Scheduled maintenance checks ===
Aircraft maintenance in civil aviation generally organized using a maintenance checks or blocks, which are packages of maintenance tasks that have to be done on an aircraft after a certain amount of time or usage. Packages are constructed by dividing the maintenance tasks into convenient, bite-size chunks to minimize the time the aircraft is out of service, to harmonise the maintenance workload level, and to maximize the use of maintenance facilities.

=== Pre-emptive engine change ===
An engine failure can significantly impact operations and revenue. A programme of calculated pre-emptive engine changes, sometimes referred to as 'power by the hour', provides budget predictability, avoids installing a loan unit during repairs when an aircraft part fails and enrolled aircraft may have a better value and liquidity.

This concept of unscheduled maintenance was initially introduced for aircraft engines to mitigate engine failures. The term was coined in the United Kingdom by Bristol Siddeley in 1962, to support Vipers of the British Aerospace 125 business jets for a fixed-sum-per-flying hour. A complete engine and accessory replacement service was provided, allowing the operator to accurately forecast this cost, and relieving him from purchasing stocks of engines and accessories.

In the 1980s, Rolls-Royce plc reinstated the programme to provide operators with a fixed engine maintenance cost over an extended period of time. Operators are assured of an accurate cost projection, and avoid any costs due to breakdowns; the term is trademarked by Rolls-Royce, but is common parlance in the aviation industry. It is an option for operators of several Rolls-Royce aircraft engines. Other aircraft engine manufacturers such as General Electric and Pratt & Whitney offer similar programmes.

Jet Support Services provides hourly cost maintenance programs independently of the manufacturers. GEMCO also offers a similar program for piston engines in general aviation aircraft. Bombardier Aerospace offers its Smart Services program, covering parts and maintenance by the hour.

=== Maintenance release ===
At the completion of any maintenance task a person authorized by the national airworthiness authority or delegated organization signs a maintenance release stating that maintenance has been performed in accordance with the applicable airworthiness requirements. A maintenance release is sometimes called a certificate of release to service (CRS).

In the case of a certified aircraft this may be a licensed aircraft maintenance engineer, Designated Airworthiness Representative – Maintenance (DAR-T) or holder of an EASA Part-66 Aircraft Maintenance License (AML), while for amateur-built aircraft this may be the owner or builder of the aircraft.

In some countries the Secretary of State may authorise a maintenance organization to grant the certification privilege to staff on their behalf.

== Maintenance personnel ==
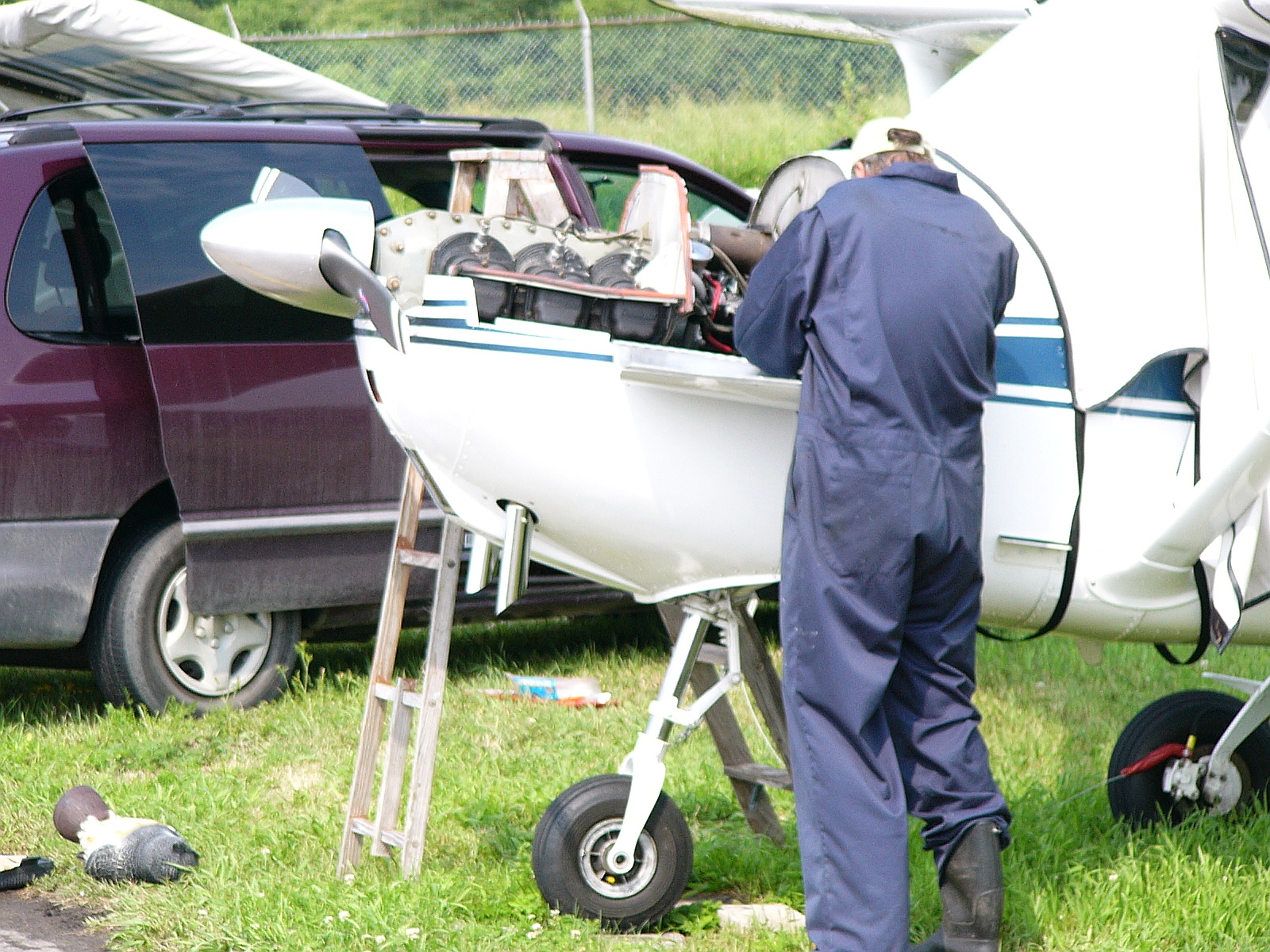
Field maintenance on a Cessna 172 being conducted from a van used to carry tools and parts

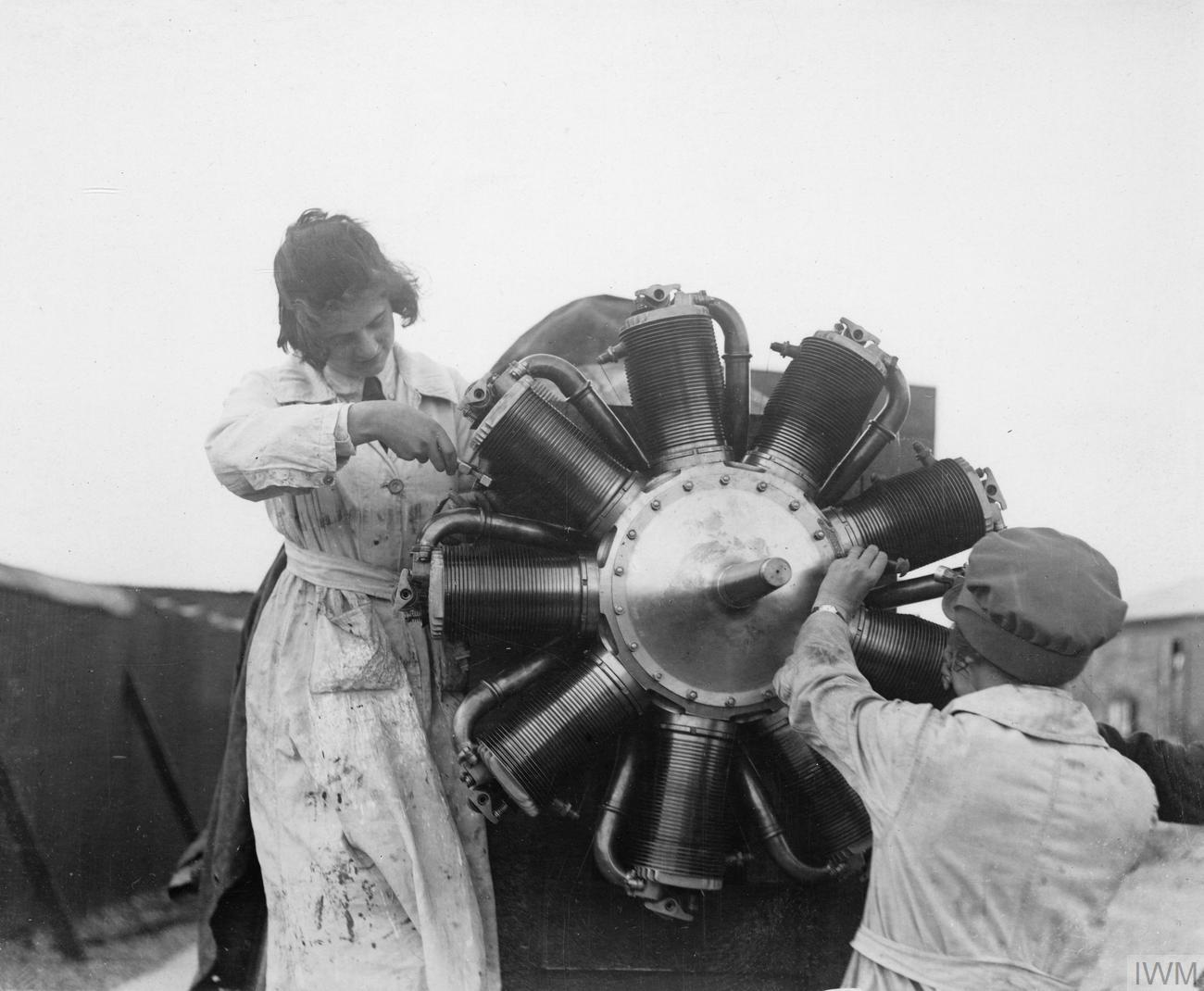
Two aircraft mechanics servicing a rotary aircraft engine, 1918

The ICAO defines the licensed or rated role of aircraft maintenance by a technician, engineer or mechanic), allowing that each contracting state may use whichever of these terms it prefers. Although aircraft maintenance technicians, engineers and mechanics all perform essentially the same role, different countries may use these terms in different ways to define their individual levels of qualification and responsibilities.

Most national and international licensing bodies make a division between the roles of carrying out repair and maintenance on the one hand, and certifying the vehicle or subsystem or component as flightworthy, on the other. ICAO requires that the certification privilege be a delegated function of the nation's responsible Secretary of State. The Secretary of State may authorize another organization to grant the certification privilege to staff on their behalf.

In Europe, licensing is governed by EASA Part-66. A person directly licensed to certify flightworthiness is a holder of a Part-66 AML (Aircraft Maintenance License).

In many other countries, including Australia, Bangla Desh, Canada, India, New Zealand and South Africa, a person directly granted the privilege of certification is a qualified AME (Aircraft Maintenance Engineer) or Licensed AME, also written as LAME or L-AME. (Unlicensed mechanics or tradespersons are sometimes informally referred to as "Unlicensed AMEs")

In the US and elsewhere in the Americas, a person rated for aircraft repair and maintenance is a qualified AMT (aircraft maintenance technician), or, colloquially, Airframe and Powerplant (A&P). A person directly designated to exercise the privilege of certification for the work is a DAR-T (Designated Airworthiness Representative – Maintenance).

Roles may be further divided up. In Europe aircraft maintenance personnel must comply with Part 66, Certifying Staff, issued by the European Aviation Safety Agency (EASA). This regulation establishes four levels of authorization:

- Level 1: General Familiarisation, Unlicensed
- Level 2: Ramp and Transit, Category A
  - can only certify own work performed for tasks which he/she has received documented training
- Level 3: Line Certifying Staff and Base Maintenance Supporting Staff, Category B1 (electromechanic) and/or B2(Avionics)
  - can certify all work performed on an aircraft/engine for which he/she is type rated excluding base maintenance (generally up to and including A-Check)
- Level 4: Base Maintenance Certifying Staff, Category C
  - can certify all work performed on an aircraft/engine for which he/she is type rated, but only if it is base maintenance (additional level-3 staff necessary)
  - this authorization does not automatically include any level 2 or level 3 license.

== Market ==
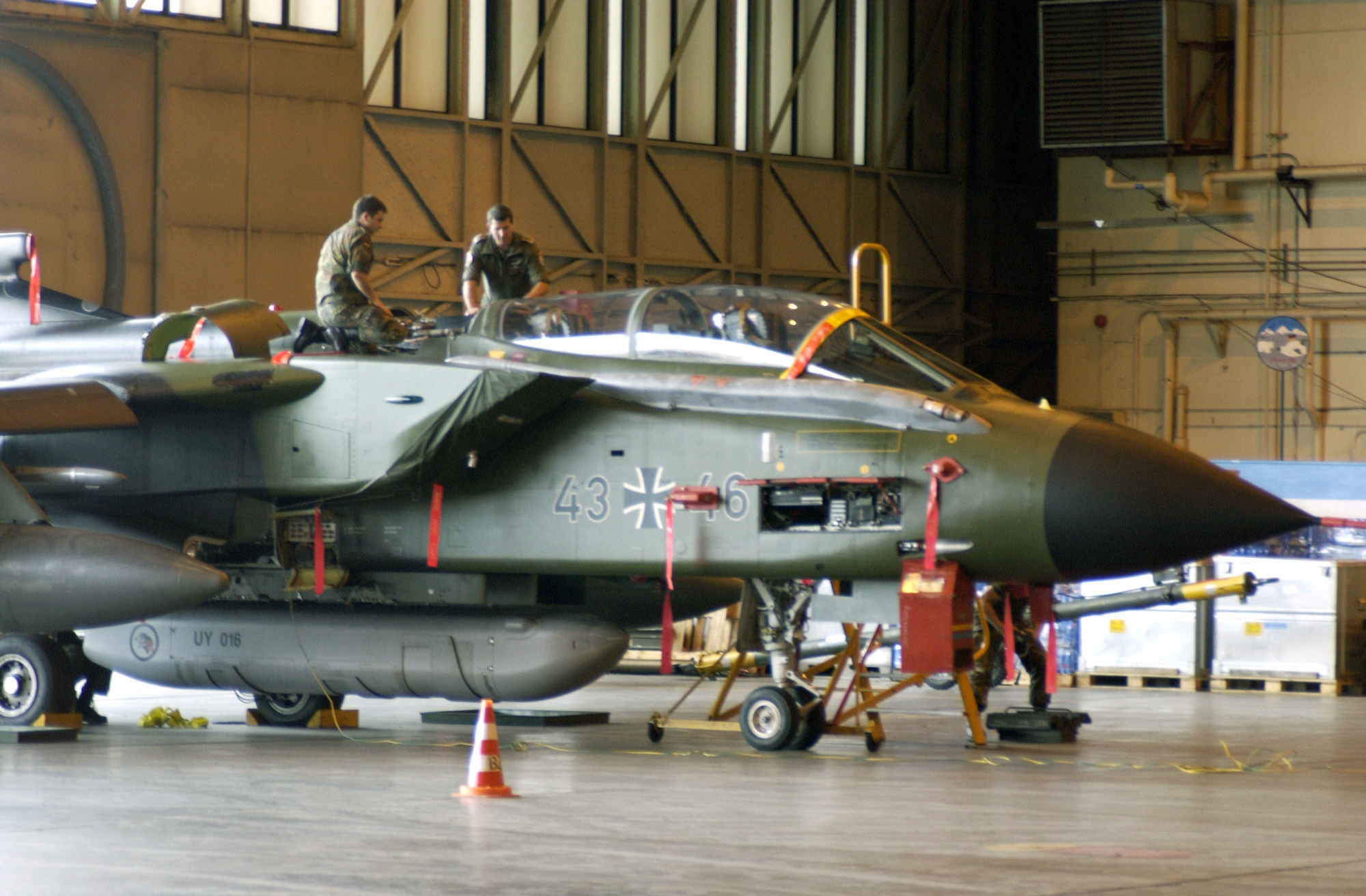
A Panavia Tornado undergoing maintenance

=== Aircraft ===
The maintenance, repair, overhaul (MRO) market was US$135.1 billion in 2015, three quarters of the $180.3 billion aircraft production market. Of this, 60% is for civil aviation: air transport 48%, business and general aviation 9%, rotorcraft 3%; and military aviation is 40%: fixed wing 27% and rotary 13%. Of the $64.3 billion air transport MRO market, 40% is for engines, 22% for components, 17% for line, 14% for airframe and 7% for modifications. It is projected to grow at 4.1% per annum until 2025 to $96 billion.

Airliner MRO should reach $74.3 billion in 2017: 51% ($37.9B) single-aisles, 21% ($15.6B) long-range twin-aisles, 8% ($5.9B) medium-range twin-aisles, 7% ($5.2B) large aircraft, 6% ($4.5B) regional jets as turboprop regional airliners and 1% ($0.7B) short range twin-aisles.

Over the 2017–2026 decade, the worldwide market should reach over $900 billion, led by 23% in North America, 22% in Western Europe, and 19% in Asia Pacific.

In 2017, of the $70 billion spent by airlines on maintenance, repair and overhaul (MRO), 31% were for engines, 27% for components, 24% for line maintenance, 10% for modifications and 8% for the airframe; 70% were for mature airliners (Airbus A320 and A330, Boeing 777 and 737NG), 23% were for "sunset" aircraft (McDonnell Douglas MD-80, Boeing 737 Classic, 747 or 757) and 7% was spent on modern models (Boeing 787, Embraer E-Jet, Airbus A350XWB and A380).

In 2018, the commercial aviation industry expended $88 billion for MRO, while military aircraft required $79.6 billion, including field maintenance.

Airliner MRO is forecast to reach $115 billion by 2028, a 4% compound annual growth rate from $77.4 billion in 2018.

Major airframe manufacturers Airbus, Boeing and Embraer entered the market, increasing concerns about intellectual property sharing. Shared data-supported predictive maintenance can reduce operational disruptions. Among other factors, prognostics helped Delta Air Lines reduce maintenance cancellations by 98% from 5,600 in 2010 to 78 in 2017.

Insourced maintenance can be inefficient for small airlines with a fleet below 50–60 aircraft. They have to either outsource it or sell its MRO services to other carriers for better resource utilization.

For example, Spain's Air Nostrum operates 45 Bombardier CRJs and ATR 72s and its 300-person maintenance department provides line, base maintenance and limited component repair for other airlines 20% of the time.

Airframe heavy maintenance is worth $6 billion in 2019: $2.9 billion for C checks and $3.1 billion for D checks, Aviation Week & Space Technology forecasts a growth to $7.5 billion in 2028 — $3.1 billion C and $4.2 billion D — for $70 billion over 10 years, 10% of the overall market compared to 40% for the engines.

=== Engines ===
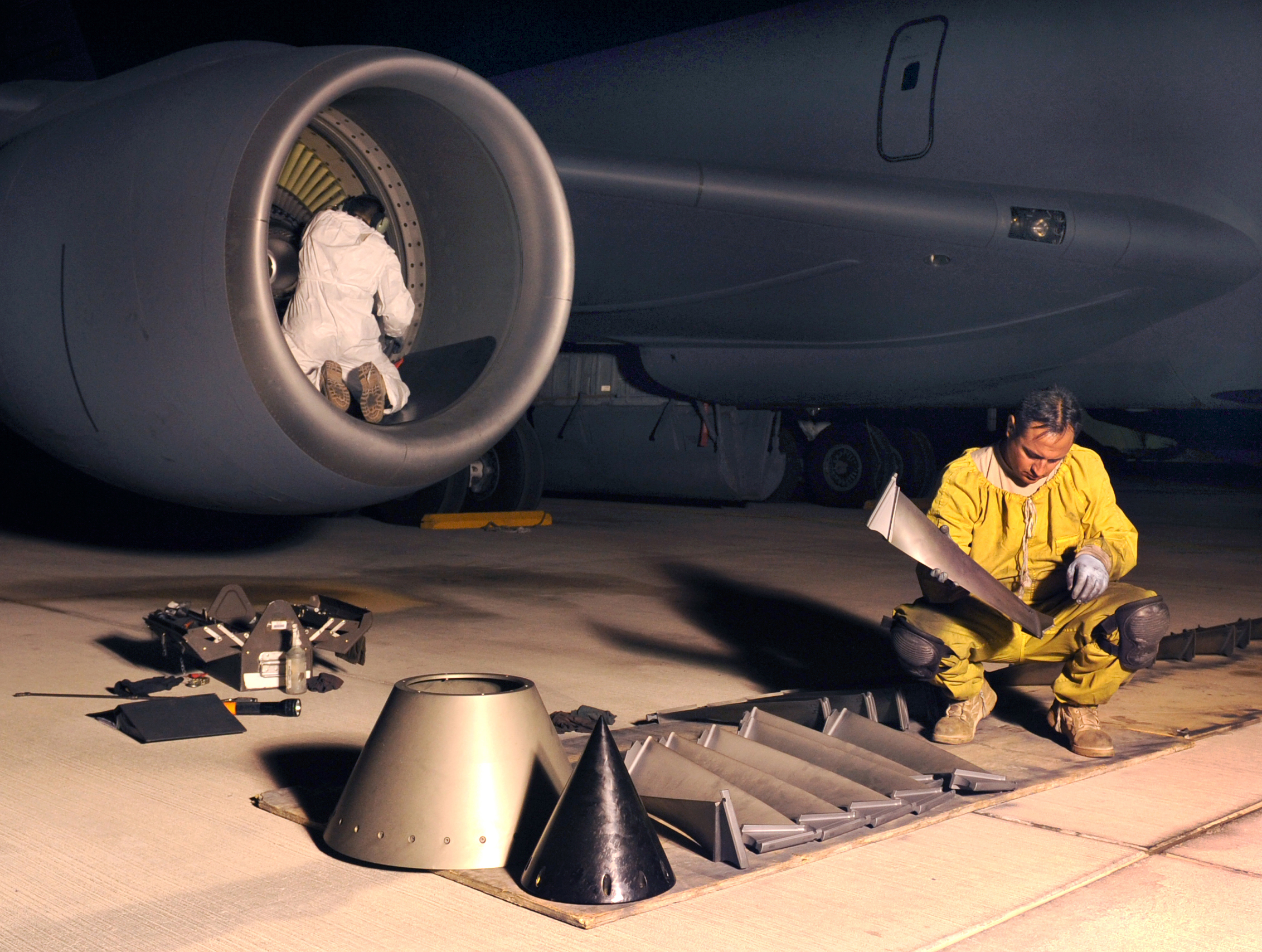
US Air force technicians disassemble and inspect the CFM56 fan blades of a KC-135, inspected every 1,500 hours.

The commercial aviation engine MRO market is anticipated by Aviation Week & Space Technology to be $25.9 billion in 2018, a 2.5 billion increase from 2017, led by 21% for the Boeing 737NG' CFM56-7B and the A320's CFM56-5B and IAE V2500 (also on the MD-90) tied for second, followed by the mature widebody engines: the GE90 then the Trent 700.

Over the 2017–2026 decade, the largest markets for turbofans will be the B737NG's CFM56-7 with 23%, the V2500-A5 with 21%, the General Electric GE90-115B with 13%, the A320's CFM56-5B with 13%, the PW1000G with 7%, the Rolls-Royce Trent 700 with 6%, the CF6-80C2 with 5%, the CFM LEAP with 5% and the General Electric CF34-8 with 4%. Between 2018 and 2022, the largest MRO demand will be for CFM engines with 36%, followed by GE with 24%, Rolls with 13%, IAE with 12% and Pratt with 7%.

As an aircraft gets older, a greater percentage of its value is represented by its engines. Over the course of the engine life it is possible to put value back in by repair and overhaul, to sell it for its remaining useful time, or to disassemble it and sell the used parts, to extract its remaining value. Its maintenance value includes the value of life-limited parts (LLPs) and the time before overhaul. The core value is the value of its data plate and non-life-limited-parts. Engine makers deeply discount their sales, up to 90%, to win the multi-year stream of spares and services, resembling the razor and blades model.

Engines installed on a new aircraft are discounted by at least 40% while spare engine values closely follow list prices. Accounting for 80% of a shop visit cost, LLP prices escalate to recoup the original discount, until engine availability increase with aircraft teardowns. Between 2001 and 2018 for the Airbus A320 or the Boeing 737-800, their CFM56 value increased from 27–29% to 48–52% of the aircraft value.

The 777-200ER's Pratt & Whitney PW4000 and the A330-300's Rolls-Royce Trent 700 engines rose from a share of 18–25% in 2001 to 29–40% in 2013. For the Airbus A320neo and Boeing 737 MAX, between 52% and 57% of their value lies in their engines: this could rise to 80–90% after ten years, while new Airbus A350 or Boeing 787 engines are worth 36–40% of the aircraft. After some time the maintenance reserves exceed the aircraft lease.

Between 2019 and 2038, 5,200 spare airliner engines will be required with at least half leased.

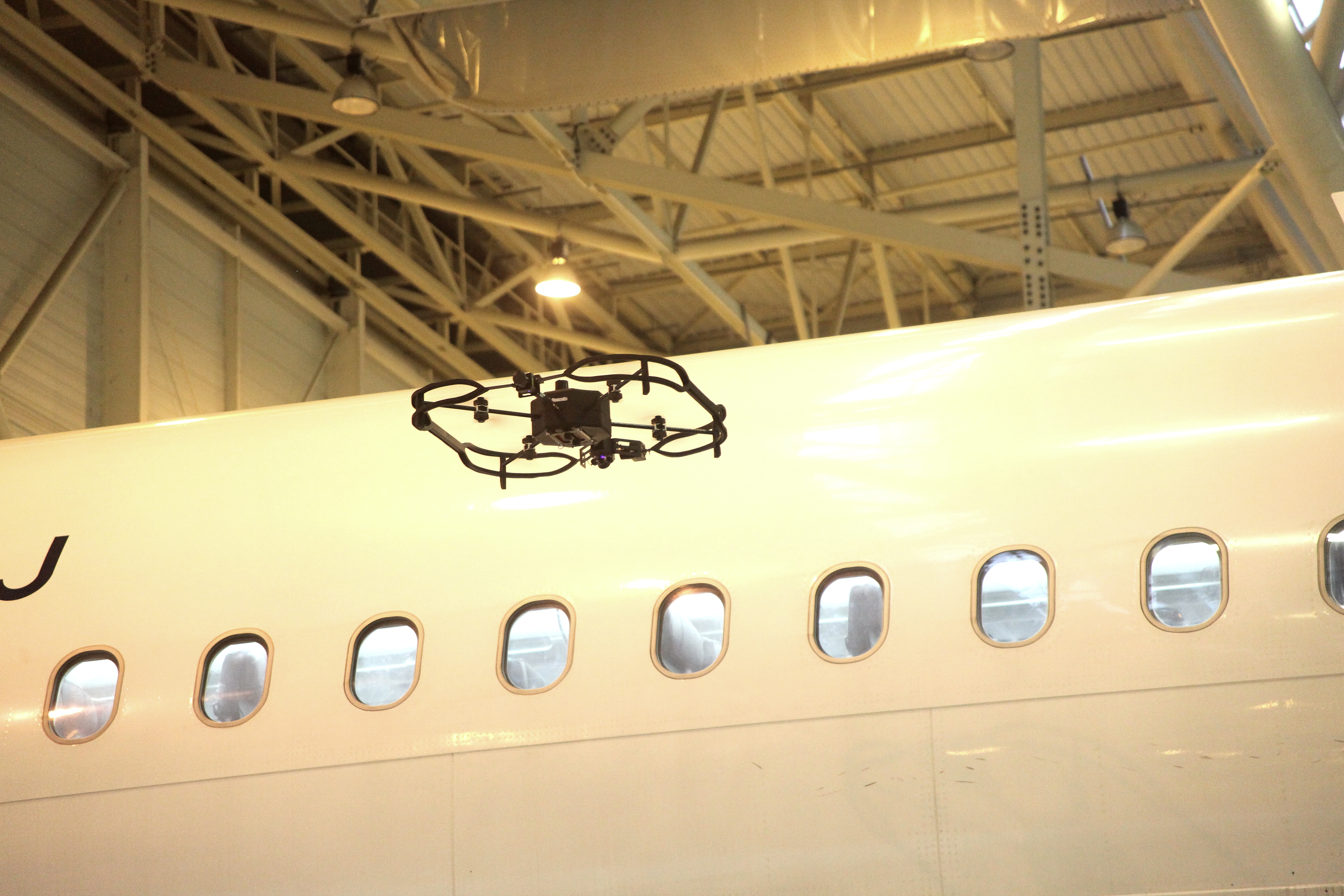
Autonomous Donecle UAV performing an aircraft inspection

== See also ==
- Groundcrew
- Line-replaceable unit
- Maintenance Resource Management
- Professional Aviation Maintenance Association
- RAMS
- Shop-replaceable unit
