= Level of repair analysis =

Analytical methodology for determining item status

In logistics support planning, Level of repair analysis (LORA) is a prescribed procedure used to determine optimal repair and maintenance policies for complex engineering systems. For systems containing large numbers of assemblies, subassemblies, and components organized into multiple levels of indenture and subject to multiple repair decisions, LORA seeks to determine an optimal provision of repair and maintenance facilities so as to minimize overall life-cycle costs.

Logistics personnel examine not only the cost of the part to be replaced or repaired but all of the elements required to make sure the job is done correctly. This includes the skill level of personnel, support equipment required to perform the task, test equipment required to test the repaired product, and the facilities required to house the entire operation.

== Process ==
LORA establishes when and where each unit will be repaired and determines if it is more cost effective to discard an item than attempt to repair it. While this kind of analysis seems costly and unnecessary, at enterprise scales over many years, significant cost savings can be realized.

For example, the LORA process may discover that replacing a part actually costs hundreds of times that amount, when all cost are considered (maintenance manpower, warehousing facilities, shipping, etc.). If this part is replaced hundreds of times per year, over the course of many years, then there may be an opportunity to save money by adjusting the repair process to leverage this economy of scale (reliability improvements, component repair, etc.).

This analysis drives the maintenance support for each repairable unit analyzed. LORA is the most important physical supportability analysis business decision made during acquisition of a system.

LORA is performed in two steps:

1. Establish noneconomic decision criteria used to make initial support decisions
2. Evaluate alternative economic models to determine the most cost effective support solution for the system.

The LORA process produces the final support solution for the system. It determines where each required maintenance action will be performed, the physical resources that must be available to support performance of maintenance, and what the support infrastructure must be capable of sustaining throughout the operational life of the system. The results of LORA are documented and used as the basis for development of the physical resources for support of the system.

=== Repair levels ===
The LORA process starts by identification of the options where maintenance can be performed. It is common for systems to use 2 or 3 levels of maintenance. LORA produces a decision for each item within the system, indicating where each maintenance action for the item will be performed.

==== Organizational level maintenance ====
Organizational, or O-level maintenance occurs at the organizational unit level, for example by a single maintenance squadron as part of an aircraft wing.

O-level maintenance is typically optimized for quick turn-around, to enhance operational availability. Maintenance at this level typically consists of immediate remove and replace (R&R) operations that replace failed (unserviceable) LRUs with spare (serviceable) assets taken from inventory. Repair-in-place (RIP) procedures are also common.

==== Intermediate level maintenance ====
Intermediate, or I-level maintenance occurs in specialized backshops that are typically allocated to multiple operating units residing at a common operating location, for example, an entire wing or multiple wings at an operating base.

Because it is more specialized, I-level maintenance allows for more thorough and time-consuming diagnostic testing and repair procedures, usually in support of failed items removed at the organizational level of repair. Test equipment is more common at this level of repair, and is used to automate many test procedures. Spare parts maintained at this level of repair are known as bench stock.

Intermediate-level maintenance deployment can vary widely, and is highly dependent on desired operating conditions. In minimal maintenance concepts, there may be minimal or no I-level maintenance, a system known as two-level maintenance (O-level & D-level). A system deploying a typical I-level repair capability would be known as a three-level maintenance system (O-, I-, and D-level).

==== Depot-level maintenance ====
Depot, or D-level maintenance typically occurs in highly specialized repair depots, or at original equipment manufacturer (OEM) facilities. These sites are typically not at operating locations, and extensive diagnostic equipment and possibly even manufacturing capabilities exist.

Equipment overhauls and modifications are typically executed at this repair level.

== Decision considerations ==
Non-economic LORA decision criteria are a list of rules or guidelines that are used to determine if there is an overriding reason why maintenance should be performed. Some organizations have policies that any item costing less than a predetermined price level will be discarded and replaced rather than be repaired.

Other decisions are addressed using cost models that calculate the possible costs of all support options and then identify the least cost solution. Then the total cost of each option can be compared to determine the lowest option in terms of long-term support over the life of the system.

== See also ==
- Logistics support analysis
