= Performance-based logistics =

Defense acquisition strategy for cost-effective weapon system support

Performance-based logistics (PBL), also known as performance-based life-cycle product support, is a defense acquisition strategy for cost-effective weapon system support which has been adopted in particular by the United States Department of Defense. Rather than contracting for the acquisition of parts or services, DoD contracts to secure outcomes or results. Under PBL, the product support manager identifies product support integrator(s) (PSI) to deliver performance outcomes as defined by performance metric(s) for a system or product. The integrator often commits to this performance level at a lower cost, or increased performance at costs similar to those previously achieved under a non-PBL or transactional portfolio of product support arrangements for goods and services.

As the preferred approach to supporting weapon system logistics, it seeks to deliver product support as an integrated, affordable performance package designed to optimize system readiness. PBL meets performance goals for a weapon system through a support structure based on long-term performance agreements with clear lines of authority and responsibility.

DoD program managers are required to develop and implement performance-based life-cycle support strategies for weapon systems. These strategies should optimize total system availability while minimizing cost and logistics footprint. Trade-off decisions involve cost, useful service, and effectiveness. The selection of the specific performance metrics should be carefully considered and supported by an operationally oriented analysis, taking into account technology maturity, fiscal constraints, and schedule. In implementing performance-based life-cycle product support strategies, the metrics should be appropriate to the scope of product support integrators and providers responsibilities and should be revisited as necessary to ensure they are motivating the desired behaviors across the enterprise.

PBL strategies do not mandate that work be contracted to commercial contractors; integrating the best features of the public and private sectors is a key component of the support strategy. Instead of a pre-ordained course of action, Product Managers are directed to implement "sustainment strategies that include the best use of public and private sector capabilities through government/industry partnering initiatives, in accordance with statutory requirements".

Many times, employing a PBL strategy has resulted in either increased system performance issues or increased costs.. Examples include the C-17 PBL, FIRST, and PBtH. Ideally, the provider profits by controlling constituent elements (PSIs) that are used to generate the performance results.

In PBL, typically a part or the whole payment is tied to the performance of the provider and the purchaser does not get involved in the details of the process, it becomes crucial to define a clear set of requirements to the provider. Occasionally governments, more particularly Defence, fail to define the requirements clearly. This leaves room for providers to, either intentionally or unintentionally, misinterpret the requirements, which creates a game like situation and excuses to deliver imperfect services.

== History ==
Beginning in the early 1990s, emerging trends towards increases in the costs to support fielded systems and decreases in the general reliability and operational readiness of weapon systems were recognized as issues that could continue if unabated. As a result, a performance-based approach, PBL, was advanced by the U.S. DoD in its annual Quadrennial Defense Review in 2001. Since then, not only has the U.S. DoD adopted the PBL approach, but other countries have adopted this strategy as well. Many programs that have employed it have yielded increased system availability, shorter maintenance cycles, and/or reduced costs.

=== Awards ===
Since the inception of the PBL concept, there have been numerous examples of DoD systems that have yielded the anticipated results, and many that have exceeded – some extremely so – the performance expectations. Annual PBL awards highlight achievement in three areas:

- component-level performance
- sub-system performance
- system-level performance

== Criticism ==
In 2009, partially in response to some who believed that PBL concepts were inadequate, and to assess the current state of DoD systems sustainment, DoD's Office of the Assistant Deputy Secretary of Defense for Materiel Readiness (OADUSD(MR)) initiated a Weapon System Acquisition Reform Product Support Assessment. Its final report, signed by Ashton B. Carter, Under Secretary of Defense for Acquisition, Technology and Logistics, affirms the essence of the PBL concept by stating, "there remains a strong consensus that an outcome-based, performance-oriented product support strategy is a worthy objective". It further identified eight areas that would make product support even more effective, if developed and improved:

1. Product Support Business Model
2. Industrial Integration Strategy
3. Supply Chain Operational Strategy
4. Governance
5. Metrics
6. Operating and Support (O&S) Costs
7. Analytical Tools
8. Human Capital.

In 2003 the United States Air Force found that logistics support contracts were more expensive than undertaking support operations in-house through their organic depot system.

== See also ==
- Cost-plus contract
- Fixed-price contract
- Military surplus
- Performance-based contracting
