= Repairable component =

Hardware component of a weapons system that can be designated for repair

A repairable component is a component of a finished good that can be designated for repair.

== Overview ==
Repairable components tend to be more expensive than non-repairable components (consumables). This is because for items that are inexpensive to procure, it is often more cost-effective not to maintain (repair) them. Repair costs can be expensive, including costs for the labor for the removal the broken or worn out part (described as unserviceable), cost of replacement with a working (serviceable) from inventory, and also the cost of the actual repair, including possible shipping costs to a repair vendor.

At maintenance facilities, such as might be found at main operating bases, inventory is controlled by site personnel. Maintenance personnel will formally "turn-in" unserviceable items for repair, receiving a funding credit in the process. These "turn-ins" will be fixed, reconditioned, or replaced. Maintenance personnel can also be issued repaired or new items back from inventory. These processes are assisted by automated logistics management systems.

In the Navy/Marine Corps supply system repairable items are identified with certain two character cognizance symbols (COGs) and one character Material Control Codes (MCCs).

In United States Marine Corps Aviation, repairables are managed by the Repairables Management Division of the Aviation Supply Department.

In the United States Air Force, repairables can be identified by their ERRC designation or SMR code.

== See also ==
- Level of repair analysis
- Repairability
- Right to repair
