= Rabiabad =

Rabiabad (Persian: ربيع آباد) may refer to:

- Rabiabad, Lorestan
- Rabiabad, South Khorasan
- Rabiabad, Yazd
