= 2+2 =

2+2 or Two plus two may refer to:

- Four, the result of the expression 2+2

== Films ==
- 2+2 (2012 film), an Argentine comedy film
- Two Plus Two (2022 film), a Mexican sex comedy film
- Do Aur Do Paanch (lit. 'Two Plus Two Equals Five'), a 1980 Indian comedy film starring Shashi Kapoor and Amitabh Bachchan

== Music ==
- 2+2 (album), a 1980 album by the vocal quartet 2+2
- "2 + 2 = 5" (song), a 2003 single by Radiohead
- "2 + 2 = ?", a 1968 anti-Vietnam War song by The Bob Seger System

== Transportation ==
- 2+2 road, a high-capacity four-lane road with at-grade intersections
- 2+2 (car body style), a car configuration with two rear seats rather than three, for a total of four seats
- Pontiac 2+2, an automobile model produced by the Pontiac Motor Division of General Motors

== Other uses ==
- 2+2 (TV channel), a national Ukrainian-language TV channel
- 2+2 photocycloaddition, a photochemical reaction
- 2 + 2 = 5, a slogan used in George Orwell's dystopian novel Nineteen Eighty-Four
- Two Plus Two Publishing, a company that publishes books on poker and gambling

== See also ==
- 4 (number)
- 2 (disambiguation)
- 2/2 (disambiguation)
- Tutu (disambiguation)
- Two two (disambiguation)
- Two by Two (disambiguation)
- For (disambiguation)
