= Oil recovery =

Oil recovery refers to the cleaning and recovery methods after an oil spill:

- Fast oil recovery
- See also: Bottsand-class oil recovery ship, Skimmer, Oil Spill Eater II, Oil Spill Response

or a form of tertiary (sometimes: improved secondary) recovery of crude oil from primary oil reserves:

- Enhanced oil recovery
  - Microbial enhanced oil recovery
  - Solar thermal enhanced oil recovery

Alternatively it may simply be used as a euphemism for:

- petroleum extraction and
- oil drilling
