= 2 (disambiguation) =

2 is a number, numeral, and glyph.

2, two or II may also refer to:

== Dates ==
- 2 AD/CE, the second year after the nominal date of Christ's birth
- 2 BC/BCE, the second year before the nominal date of Christ's birth
- February, the second month of the modern calendar year

== Music ==
=== Bands ===
- Two (metal band)

=== Albums ===
- 2 (All Girl Summer Fun Band album), 2003
- 2 (Black Country Communion album), 2011
- 2 (The Black Heart Procession album), 1999
- 2 (Ned Collette album), 2012
- 2 (Darker My Love album), 2008
- 2 (Mac DeMarco album), 2012
- 2 (Dover album), 2007
- 2 (The Gloaming album), 2016
- 2 (Erkin Koray album), 1976
- 2 (Amaia Montero album), 2011
- 2 (Mudcrutch album), 2016
- 2 (Netsky album), 2012
- 2 (Olivia Newton-John album), 2002
- 2 (Nik & Jay album), 2004
- 2 (Florent Pagny album), 2001
- 2 (Pole album), 1999
- 2 (Retribution Gospel Choir album), 2010
- 2 (Rockapella album), 2000
- 2 (Saint Lu album), 2013, by Luise Gruber
- 2 (Smoking Popes EP), 1993
- 2 (Sneaky Sound System album), 2008
- 2 (Strings album), 1992
- 2 (Thee Oh Sees album), 2004, released under the name, OCS
- 2 ((G)-dle album), 2024
- II (Cursed album), 2005
- Two (The Calling album), 2004
- Two (Earshot album), 2004
- Two (GQ album), 1980
- Two (Bob James album), 1975
- Two (Lenka album), 2011
- Two (Miss Kittin & The Hacker album), 2009
- Two (Jemeel Moondoc album), 2012, with Connie Crothers
- Two (Soko album), 2005
- Two (Tebey album), 2014
- Two (Thomas Anders & Uwe Fahrenkrog album), 2011
- Two (Utah Saints album), 2000
- Two (Poverty), 2007, by Demiricous
- Two (Junho album), 2019
- T.W.O (ティー・ダブリュ・オー), 2003
- Tages 2, commonly referred to as just 2, 1966
- II, Siam Shade album, 1995

=== EPs ===
- Two (Charlotte Church EP), 2013
- 2 (Smoking Popes EP), 1993
- #2 (Suburban Kids with Biblical Names EP), 2005

=== Songs ===
- "Two" a song by band Psapp from their album The Camel's Back
- "Two", a song by singer Ryan Adams from his album Easy Tiger
- "Two", a song by singer Todrick Hall
- "Two", a song by musical duo Twenty One Pilots from their album Regional At Best
- "Two", a song by band Simple Plan from their album Harder Than It Looks
- "Two", a song by bbno$
- "Song 2", a song by Blur

== Film and television ==
=== Films ===
- Two (1964 film), an Indian film
- Two (1974 film), an American film
- Two (2002 film), a French film
- 2 (film), an Indian film
- Any film sequel

=== Television ===
- Two (TV series), a Canadian drama series from 1996 to 1997
- "Two" (Dark Angel), an episode of the television series Dark Angel
- "Two" (The Twilight Zone), a 1961 episode of The Twilight Zone
- Two, a character from Battle for Dream Island: The Power of Two, an animated web series
- Two, a character in Numberblocks
- BBC Two, a British television station
  - BBC Two "Computer Generated 2" ident, used from 1979 to 1986
  - BBC Two "Two" ident, a television ident for BBC Two, used from 1986 to 1991
- France 2, a channel that is part of France Television
- RTP2, formerly "2:" or "a dois", a Portuguese television station
- SVT 2, a Swedish television channel
- TVR 2, a Romania television channel
- TVNZ 2, formerly TV2, a New Zealand television station

== Transportation ==
- 2 (New York City Subway service), a service of the New York City Subway
- Tai Wo station, Hong Kong; MTR station code TWO
- Line 2

=== Automobiles ===
- Haima 2, a Chinese subcompact hatchback
- Mazda 2, a Japanese hatchback
- Nikola Two, a proposed electric semi-truck tractor unit

== Mathematics ==
- ² (square in algebra), multiplying a number by itself
- **2** (algebra), the two-element Boolean algebra, for which Paul Halmos introduced the bolded "**2**" notation
- ②, the Stenhaus-Moser number also called mega (number)

== Other uses ==
- 2 Pallas, a large asteroid in the asteroid belt with two unconfirmed moons

== See also ==
- 02 (disambiguation)
- 2. (disambiguation)
- 2+2 (disambiguation)
- Couple (disambiguation)
- Duo (disambiguation)
- II (disambiguation)
- Number Two (disambiguation)
- Square (disambiguation)
- Second (disambiguation)
- Too (disambiguation)
- Tue (disambiguation)
- Two by Two (disambiguation)
- Two two (disambiguation)
- Year Two, an educational year group in schools
