= Tutu (name) =

Tutu is both a surname and a given name.

== People with the surname ==
- Desmond Tutu (1931–2021), South African archbishop, activist against apartheid, and Nobel Peace Prize winner
  - Nomalizo Leah Tutu (born 1933), his wife
- Osei Kofi Tutu I (died 1717), Ashantehene, ruler of Kumasi, co-founder of the Empire of Ashanti
- Otumfuo Nana Osei Tutu II (born 1950), 16th Asantehene, King of the Ashanti
  - Julia Osei Tutu, his wife
- Skelley Adu Tutu (born 1979), Ghanaian footballer
- Constantin Țuțu (born 1987), a Moldovan Muay Thai kickboxer
- Tutu Chengcui (died 820), a powerful eunuch during the reign of Chinese Emperor Xianzong

== People with the given name ==
- Tutu (Egyptian official), an official during the period 1350–1335 BC
- Tutu Atwell (born 1999), American football player
- Tutu Jones (b. 1966), an American blues musician
- Tutu Puoane (born 1979), a South African jazz singer

== Fictional characters ==
- Tūtū (Lilo & Stitch), a fictional character the 2025 live-action Lilo & Stitch film

== See also ==
- Tutu (disambiguation)
