= Tootoo =

Tootoo (ᑐᑐ) is an Inuit surname. People with the name include:

- Jordin Tootoo (born 1983), Inuktitut: ᔪᐊᑕᓐ ᑐᑐ, Canadian hockey player
- Hunter Tootoo (born 1963), Inuktitut: ᕼᐊᓐᑕ ᑐᑐ, Canadian politician

== See also ==
- Tutu (disambiguation)
- Two two (disambiguation)
- Too Too (1990–2023), Burmese Lethwei fighter
- Too-Too (Doctor Dolittle), Doctor Dolittle's pet owl and accountant
- Henry To'oTo'o (born 2001), American football player
- Tootoosis (Surname)
