= Two by Two =

Two by Two, two by two, 2×2 or 2by2 may refer to:

== Arts, entertainment and media ==
=== Literature ===
- Two by Two (novel), a 2016 novel written by Nicholas Sparks

=== Film and television ===
- 2×2 (TV channel), a TV channel in Russia
- Two by Two, or Ooops! Noah Is Gone..., a 2015 animated film
- "Two by Two" (Balamory), a 2002 television episode
- "Two By Two", a Rugrats TV episode

=== Music and musicals ===
- Two by Two (musical), a 1970 Broadway show with music by Richard Rodgers

==== Albums ====
- Two by Two (album), by Blue Zoo, 1983
- 2x2 (album), a boxed set of albums by Milli Vanilli, 1989
- 2 X 2, a 1997 album by Gigi
- II x II, a 1970 album by The Cowsills

==== Songs ====
- "Two by Two", from the musical The Book of Mormon
- "Two By Two", a song by Quasi from the 1999 album Field Studies
- "2 X 2", a song by Bob Dylan from the 1990 album Under the Red Sky
- Two by Two, a 1988 song by Cristiana Cucchi

== Construction ==
- In North America, 2 × 2 is one of several nominal sizes (in inches) of softwood lumber used for purposes such as deck railing

== Other uses ==
- 2x2, a two-wheeled two-wheel drive vehicle
- 2by2, an American lottery game
- 2x2 Project, a public health journalism initiative
- Two-by-two matrix, a square matrix of order 2

== See also ==
- Two (disambiguation)
- 2+2 (disambiguation)
- Two two (disambiguation)
- Pocket Cube, a puzzle device also known as a 2×2×2 Rubik's Cube
- Two by Twos, a Christian based religious movement/organization
