= For =

For or FOR may refer to:

== English language ==
- For, a preposition
- For, a complementizer
- For, a grammatical conjunction

== Science and technology ==
- for loop, a programming language statement
- Fornax, a constellation
- Fast oil recovery, systems to remove an oil spill from a wrecked ship
- Field of regard, in optoelectronics
- Forced outage rate, in reliability engineering
- Frame of reference, in physics

== Other uses ==
- Fellowship of Reconciliation, a number of religious nonviolent organizations
- Fortaleza Airport (IATA airport code), an airport in Brazil
- Revolutionary Workers Ferment (Fomento Obrero Revolucionario), a small left communist international
- Field of Research, a component of the Australian and New Zealand Standard Research Classification
- FOR, free on rail, a historic form of international commercial term or Incoterm
- "For", a song by Dreamcatcher from Apocalypse: Save Us, 2022

== See also ==
- 4 (disambiguation)
