= Availability factor =

Measure of power plant productivity

The availability factor of a power plant is the duration it achieves production of electricity divided by the duration that it was planned to produce electricity. In the field of reliability engineering, availability factor is known as operational availability, $A_o$. The capacity factor of a plant includes numerous other factors which determine the durations the plant is planned to produce electricity. A solar photovoltaic plant is not planned to operate in the dark of a night, hence unplanned maintenance occurring whilst the sun is set does not impact the availability factor.

Periods of generation where only partial generation of planned capacity occurs may or may not be deducted from the availability factor. An example of partial generation is a power plant with four installed turbines planned to be concurrently operational, but one of those turbines subsequently requires unplanned maintenance. Where deductions are made the metric is titled equivalent availability factor (EAF).

The availability of a power plant varies greatly depending on the type of fuel, the design of the plant and how the plant is operated. Everything else being equal, plants that are run less frequently have higher availability factors because they require less maintenance and because more inspections and maintenance can be scheduled during idle time. Most thermal power stations, such as coal, geothermal and nuclear power plants, have availability factors between 70% and 90%. Newer plants tend to have significantly higher availability factors, but preventive maintenance is as important as improvements in design and technology. Gas turbines have relatively high availability factors, ranging from 80% to 99%. Gas turbines are commonly used for peaking power plants, co-generation plants and the first stage of combined cycle plants.

Originally the term availability factor was used only for power plants that depended on an active, controlled supply of fuel, typically fossil or later also nuclear. The emergence of renewable energy such as hydro, wind and solar power, which operate without an active, controlled supply of fuel and which come to a standstill when their natural supply of energy ceases, requires a more careful distinction between the availability factor and the capacity factor. By convention, such zero production periods are counted against the capacity factor but not against the availability factor, which thus remains defined as depending on an active, controlled supply of fuel, along with factors concerning reliability and maintenance. A wind turbine cannot operate in wind speeds above a certain limit, which counts against its availability factor. With this definition, modern wind turbines which require very little maintenance, have very high availability factors, up to about 98%. Photovoltaic power stations which have few or no moving parts and which can undergo planned inspections and maintenance during night have an availability factor approaching or equal to 100% when the sun is shining.

== See also ==
- Operational availability – Measurement of the actual versus predicted uptime of a system
- Capacity factor – Electrical production measure
- Forced outage rate – shutdown condition of a power station, transmission line or distribution line when the generating unit is unavailable to produce power due to unexpected breakdown
- Generating Availability Data System – US power plant information
- High availability – Systems with high up-time, a.k.a. "always on"
- List of energy storage projects
- Reliability engineering – Sub-discipline of systems engineering that emphasizes dependability
- Uptime – Period when a computer system is available
- Utilization factor – Ratio of the time that a piece of equipment is in use to the total time that it could be in use
