= Second line =

Second line may refer to:

- Second Line (album), a 2021 album by American singer-songwriter Dawn Richard.
- Second line (ice hockey), an offensive unit generally composed of second-tier players
- Second line (parades), a tradition in brass band parades in New Orleans, Louisiana, as well as an associated traditional dance style
- Second Line (shipping line), a shipping line also known as Robert Kermits Red Star Line or New Line
- "Second Line" (Mayfair Witches), a 2023 television episode
- The Second Line, an American jazz magazine

== See also ==
- Line 2 (disambiguation), several transit lines
- Second Avenue Line (disambiguation)
