= 2/2 =

2/2 may refer to:

- 2nd Battalion, 2nd Marines, a light infantry battalion in the United States Marine Corps
- 2/2, a time signature in music
  - Alla breve a musical meter notated by, the equivalent of 2/2
- February 2, a date

== See also ==
- 2+2 (disambiguation)
- Two two (disambiguation)
- 2/2nd Anti-Tank Regiment (Australia)
- 2/2nd Machine Gun Battalion (Australia)
