= Otumfuo Nana Osei Tutu II =

King of the Ashanti (Asantehene)

Osei Tutu II
- Asantehene of Asante
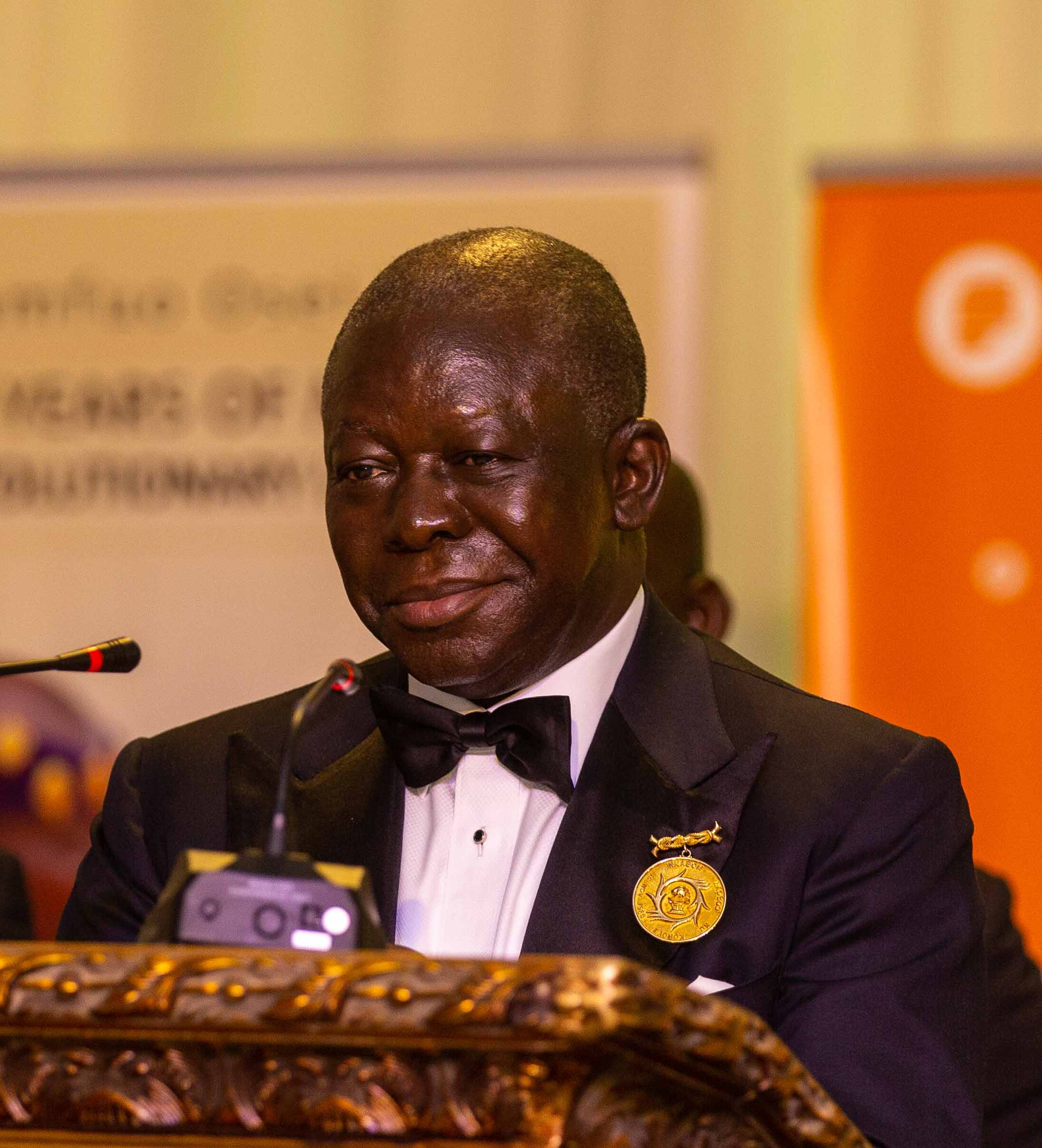
- Osei Tutu II in 2019

King (Asantehene) of the Asante Kingdom
- Reign: 26 April 1999 – present
- Enstoolment: 26 April 1999
- Predecessor: Opoku Ware II
- Born: Nana Barima Kwaku Duah; 6 May 1950 (age 76); Kumasi, Ashanti Region, Gold Coast (now Ghana)
- Spouse: Julia Amaning (m. 2002)
- Issue: 7 children
- House: Oyoko dynasty
- Father: Nana Kwame Boakye-Dankwa
- Mother: Nana Afua Kobi Serwaa Ampem II
- Religion: Anglicanism
- Education: University of Professional Studies

Otumfuo Nana Osei Tutu II (born Nana Barima Kwaku Duah, 6 May 1950) is the 16th Asantehene, King of the Ashanti Kingdom. He was enstooled on 26 April 1999, succeeding his cousin Otumfuo Opoku Ware II, and is the custodian of the Golden Stool, the sacred symbol of Asante unity and authority. He is also the 16th occupant of the Golden Stool.

He was educated at Sefwi-Wiawso Secondary School and Osei Kyeretwie Secondary School, and later studied at Institute of Professional Studies (IPS) in Accra, where he studied Accounting. Prior to his enstoolment, he worked in the private sector in the United Kingdom, building a professional career in accounting and management.

Since ascending the Golden Stool, Osei Tutu II has overseen a period marked by institutional strengthening of traditional governance, peacebuilding, and development-oriented initiatives. He chaired the Committee of Eminent Chiefs, which played a central role in resolving the Dagbon chieftaincy crisis, culminating in the restoration of peace in 2019.

He is the founder of the Otumfuo Osei Tutu II Foundation, which focuses on education, health, and youth development, and has supported hundreds of thousands of beneficiaries across Ghana. He also serves as Chancellor of the Kwame Nkrumah University of Science and Technology (KNUST).

His reign has been marked by periodic milestone commemorations, including the 20th and 25th anniversaries of his enstoolment, reflecting his influence within Asante society and Ghana’s contemporary traditional governance system.

== Early life and education ==
Otumfuo Nana Osei Tutu II was born Nana Barima Kwaku Duah on 6 May, 1950 in Kumasi, Ashanti Region, Gold Coast (now Ghana). He is the third son and youngest of five children (three sons and two daughters) of Nana Afia Kobi Serwaa Ampem II, Asantehemaa (Queen-mother of the Ashanti) and Nana Kwame Boakye-Dankwa who hailed from Kentinkyere in Ashanti.

Osei Tutu II was named after his paternal grandfather, Ohenenana Kwaku Duah (Nana Agari), Brahyiahene, of Kentinkyere in the Atwima district.

His siblings include the late Nana Ama Konadu, (Nana Konadu Yiadom III) who is the 14th Asanteheemaa, as well as the late Barima Kwabena Poku, Barima Akwasi Prempeh.

When he was about five years old, Otumfuo moved into the royal household of his uncle, Oheneba Mensah Bonsu, the Hiahene, enstooled in 1952, as early preparation for his future role.

He had his elementary education in Kumasi and in 1964, went on to the Sefwi Wiawso Secondary School (SEWASS) where he obtained his 'O' Level and was taught by the late Omanhene of Sefwi Wiawso, Nana Kwadwo Aduhene II who was a cousin of Otumfuo's guardian uncle, Hiahene. He also attended the Osei Kyeretwie Secondary School (OKESS) for his A level, completing in 1969. He studied Accounting at the Institute of Professional Studies (IPS) in Accra (now the University of Professional Studies, Accra) where he studied accounting and business related courses.

Nana Barima Kwaku Duah continued his education in the United Kingdom, studying accountancy at Kilburn Polytechnic before attending the University of North London, where he studied human resource development and public administration.

In December 2006, he received an honorary doctorate in philosophy from London Metropolitan University, which lists him among its 2006 honorary graduates. The award was presented during a graduation ceremony at the Barbican Centre in London.

== Career before enstoolment ==
Prior to his enstoolment as Asantehene, Nana Barima Kwaku Duah pursued a career in management, insurance and business. Between 1981 and 1985, he worked as a senior consultant with Mutual of Omaha in Toronto, Canada. In 1985, he returned to London, where he was appointed personnel administrator at the Manpower Services Commission attached to Brent London Borough Council. He also worked as a finance officer with the British firm Oxon.

During the mid-1980s, he established Primoda Financial Services Limited, a mortgage finance business based on Kilburn High Road in northwest London.

In 1989, he returned to Ghana and established Transpomech International (Ghana) Limited, a business operating in the transport sector.

== Reign as Asantehene ==
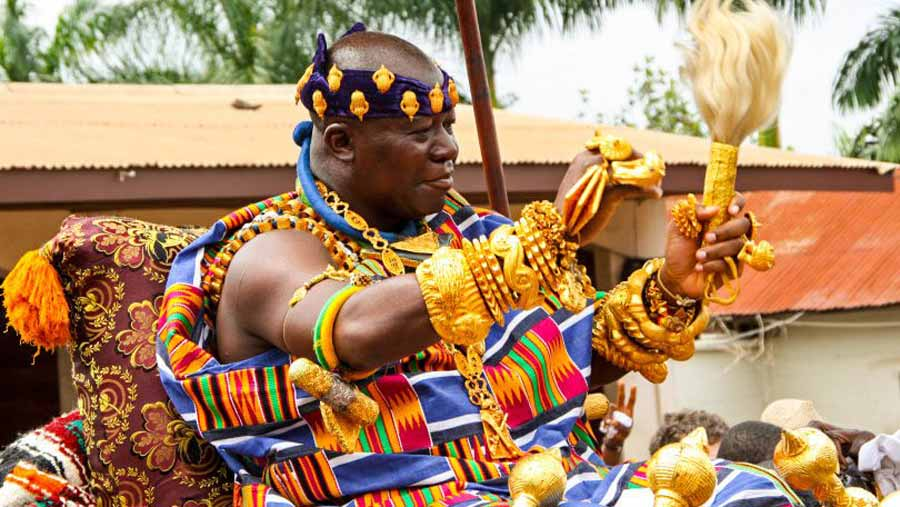
Osei Tutu II riding in a palanquin

=== Enstoolment as Asantehene ===
Following the death of Opoku Ware II on 25 February 1999, Nana Barima Kwaku Duah was selected to succeed him as Asantehene. He was enstooled on 26 April 1999, taking the regnal name Otumfuo Osei Tutu II and becoming the 16th occupant of the Golden Stool.

The enstoolment involved customary rites, including the swearing of oaths by the new Asantehene and the paramount chiefs of Asanteman. The ceremonies were held in Kumasi, with activities at Manhyia Palace and the Kumasi Sports Stadium.

=== Role as Asantehene ===
As Asantehene, Otumfuo Nana Osei Tutu II is the traditional ruler and cultural head of the Asante Kingdom, one of the most influential traditional states in Ghana. He serves as the custodian of Asante customs, institutions, and symbols of authority, including the Golden Stool, which represents the unity and sovereignty of the Asante people.

He presides over the Asanteman Council, the governing body of the Asante Kingdom, which is composed of paramount chiefs from the various Asante traditional areas. In this capacity, he provides leadership on matters relating to customary law, chieftaincy affairs, and dispute resolution within Asanteman.

Under Ghana’s constitutional framework, Otumfuo Nana Osei Tutu II performs a non-partisan role, as chiefs are prohibited from active party politics. His responsibilities therefore focus on traditional governance, mediation, and cultural leadership rather than political administration.

Beyond his customary functions, the Asantehene engages with state institutions, civil society organisations, and international bodies on issues relating to education, development, peacebuilding, and cultural heritage.

=== Anniversary commemorations ===
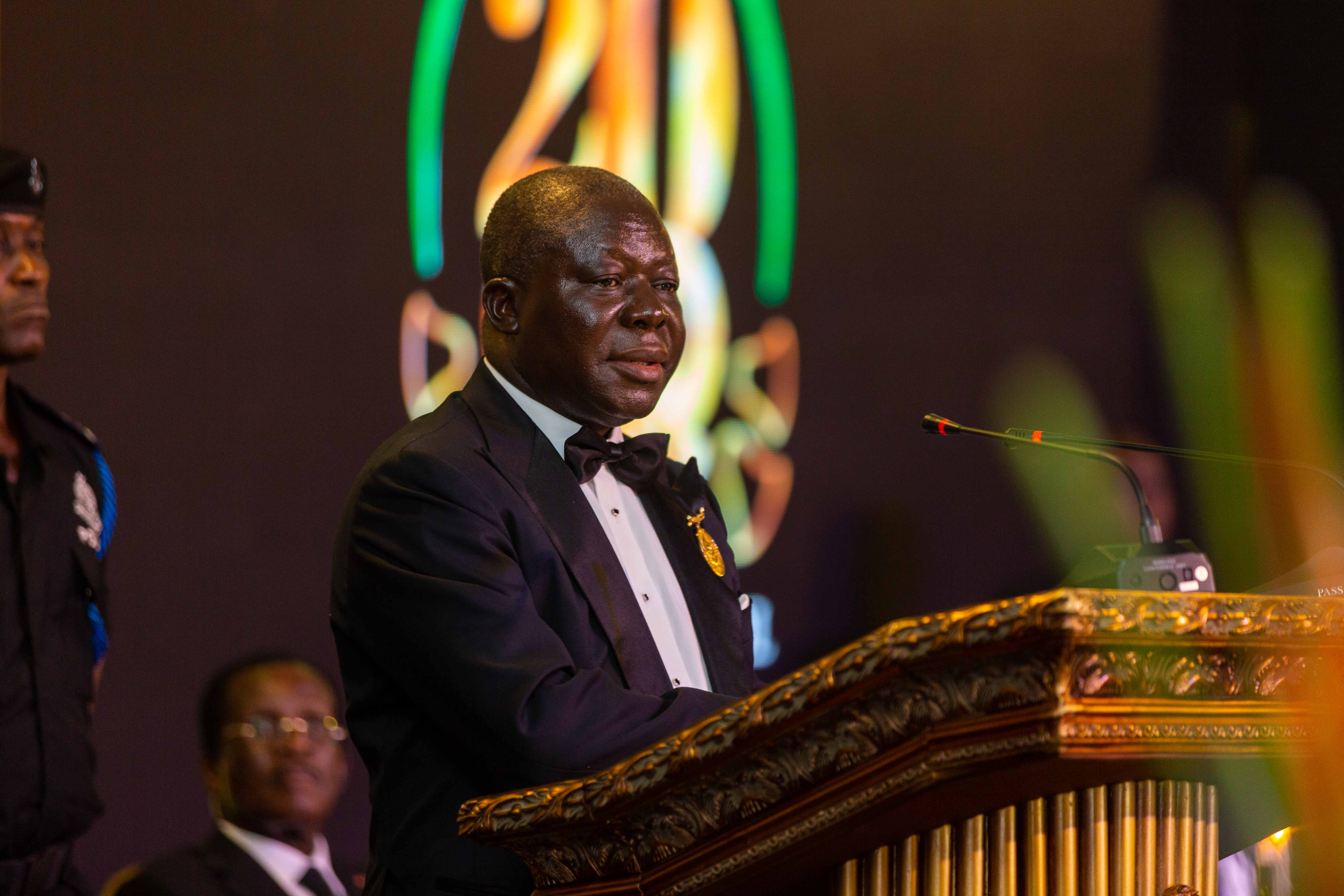
Osei Tutu in May 2019 during 20th Anniversary commemorative Dinner

=== Anniversary commemorations ===
In 2019, Osei Tutu II marked the 20th anniversary of his enstoolment with a series of activities in Kumasi. The programme included traditional ceremonies, religious thanksgiving services, cultural exhibitions, an Asanteman development summit and a grand durbar in Kumasi.

The main celebration was held on 21 April 2019 and coincided with Akwasidaekese, a major Asante ceremonial durbar held at the Manhyia Palace. The event was attended by President Nana Akufo-Addo of Ghana, Ashwin Adhin, then Vice President of Suriname, and Togbui Sri III, the Awomefia of the Anlo state. Traditional rulers, diplomats and other international representatives also participated in the celebration.

In 2024, the silver jubilee of his reign was commemorated through a series of traditional, cultural and public events, including ceremonies marking the anniversary of the Sagrenti War and the return of Asante cultural artefacts. The celebrations culminated in a grand Akwasidaekese durbar on 12 May 2024 at the Dwabirem grounds of the Manhyia Palace in Kumasi. Attendees included President Nana Akufo-Addo, Vice President Mahamudu Bawumia, Prime Minister Keith Rowley of Trinidad and Tobago, traditional rulers and international delegations. The Golden Stool was publicly displayed during the celebration.

=== Environmental protection ===
In July 2019, Otumfuo Osei Tutu II announced his devotion to protect the water bodies of the Asante Kingdom. This would involve the planting of 2.5 million trees around Lake Bosomtwe and would covering approximately 4,000 hectares. The initiative was intended to restore vegetation, protect the lake and improve environmental conditional in surrounding communities. The project was organised through a partnership between Oheneba Poku Foundation and Manhyia Palace as well as the Forestry Commission, the Environmental Protection Agency (EPA), the Water Resources Commission, with support from government agencies and other organisations.

In June 2023, he launched Ghana's Green Ghana Day activities in Kumasi and called for action against illegal mining and the destruction of forest reserves.

=== Otumfuo Lottery Game ===
The Asantehene collaborated with the National Lottery Authority (NLA) and to launch the Otumfuo Lottery Game. This was a fundraising initiative to support the Otumfuo Charity Foundation. In May 2019, a working committee that composed of members of the National Lottery Authority (NLA), the State Enterprise Commission (SEC) and the Asante state's governance team, presented a report to the monarch for approval. The National Association of Private Lotto Operators and Agents in Ghana expressed their preparedness to embrace the game so its objective would be achieved.

=== International engagement ===
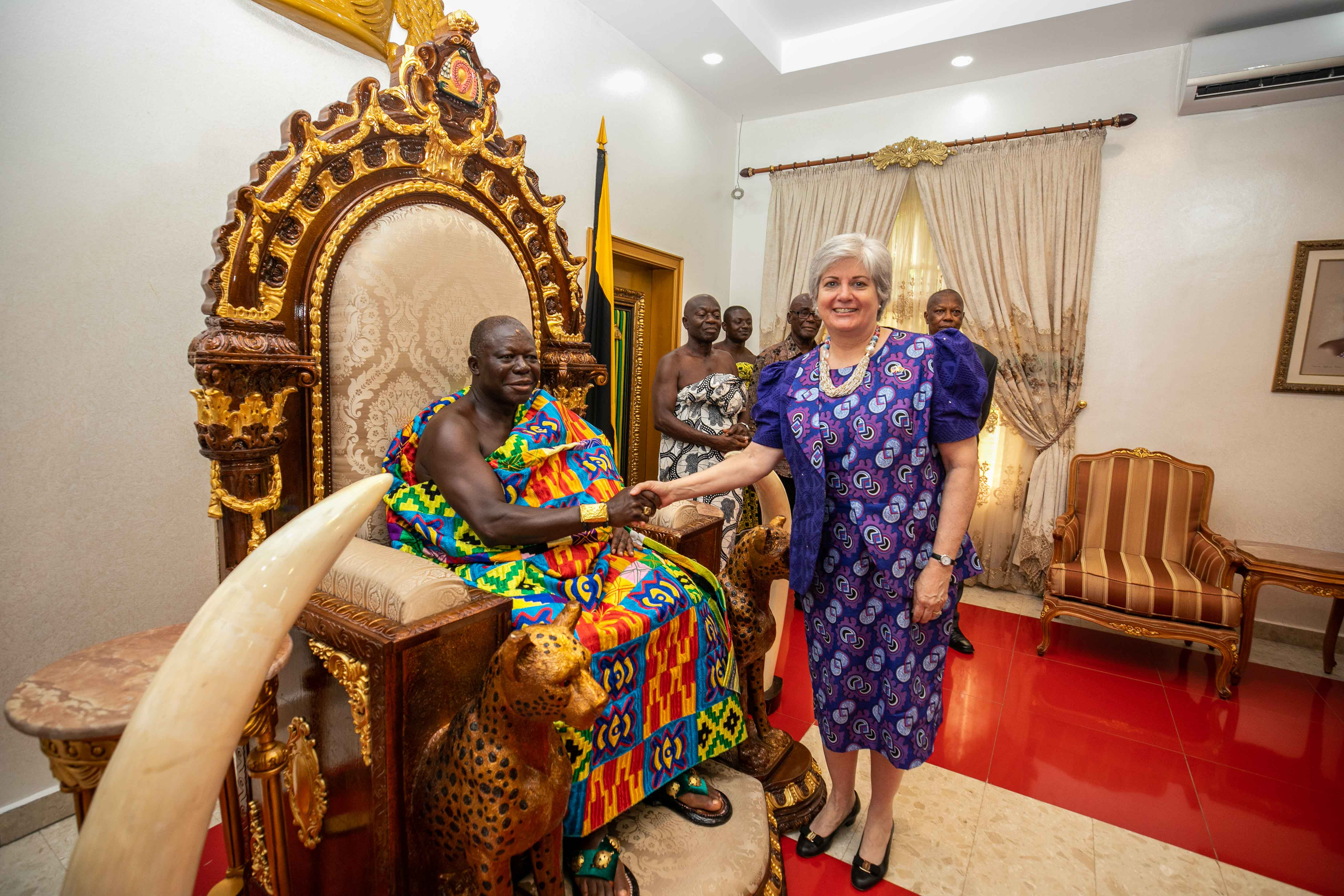
U.S. ambassador Sullivan greeting Osei Tutu II in 2019

In August 2019, Osei Tutu II celebrated Akwasidae with members of the Ghanaian community in London. The event was attended by ]Ghana’s High Commissioner to the United Kingdom, Papa Owusu-Ankomah was among those who attended.

On 19 July 2024, he delivered a keynote lecture at the British Museum in London on the theme "Asante Culture and Heritage" to mark his silver jubilee as Asantehene.

=== Heal Komfo Anokye Project ===
In November 2023, Osei Tutu II launched the Heal Komfo Anokye project, a fundraising initiative with a target of US$10 million to renovate facilities at the Komfo Anokye Teaching Hospital in Kumasi. This project was estiablished to address the deteriorating condition of the hospital's main inpatient blocks, including wards and supporting facilities.

The project covers the renovation of the hospital's main blocks, with work organised in phases. During an inspection on 31 January 2025, Osei Tutu II toured the renovated sections of Block A. Project officials reported that Phase One was approximately 95% complete, with the renovated wards awaiting final installations before becoming operational.

== Peace and conflict resolution ==
=== Conflict mediation ===
In 2002, President John Agyekum Kufuor constituted a Committee of Eminent Chiefs, chaired by Otumfuo Osei Tutu II, to mediate the Dagbon chieftaincy crisis following the killing of Ya-Na Yakubu Andani II. The committee was mandated to facilitate dialogue between the Abudu and Andani royal families and to propose a roadmap for restoring peace in the Kingdom of Dagbon.

The committee submitted its recommendations to the Government of Ghana in November 2018. These recommendations formed the basis for a series of traditional rites, including the funerals of Ya-Na Mahamadu IV and Ya-Na Yakubu Andani II between December 2018 and January 2019, culminating in the enskinment of Ya-Na Bukali II as the substantive ruler of Dagbon. In recognition of his role in the peace process, Ya-Na Bukali II later paid a courtesy call on Otumfuo Osei Tutu II at the Manhyia Palace.

Beyond Dagbon, Otumfuo Osei Tutu II has also been involved in mediation efforts related to other chieftaincy and communal conflicts in Ghana, including ongoing peace initiatives in the Bawku traditional area. His role in such interventions reflects the continued relevance of traditional authority in complementing state-led conflict resolution mechanisms.

=== Chieftaincy administration and discipline ===
As Asantehene, Otumfuo Nana Osei Tutu II exercises judicial authority over traditional rulers within Asanteman, including the power to sanction, suspend, or destool chiefs who violate customary laws, oaths, or administrative directives. These powers form part of the Asante traditional governance system and are intended to uphold accountability and social order.

In 2002, he destooled the chief of Bonwire, Ohenenana Kwaku Duah, for insubordination and breaches of customary procedures relating to the installation and deposition of sub-chiefs. In April 2018, the Atwimahene, Nana Antwi Agyei Brempong II, was destooled after being found guilty of misuse of the Great Oath and defiance of directives concerning land administration. He was later reinstated following an appeal process, reflecting the role of mediation and corrective justice within the traditional system.

In more recent years, Otumfuo Nana Osei Tutu II has sanctioned several chiefs for involvement in illegal mining activities and land-related misconduct, reflecting broader efforts to address environmental degradation and unlawful land use within Asanteman. These actions have included destoolments and fines imposed in accordance with customary law.

== Charity work ==
Otumfuo Nana Osei Tutu II’s charitable activities are primarily undertaken through the Otumfuo Osei Tutu II Foundation (OOTIIF), a philanthropic organisation formally launched in April 2009 to support development initiatives in education and health. The foundation evolved from earlier charitable efforts associated with his reign, including the Otumfuo Education Fund, established in 1999, and the Serwaa Ampem Foundation for Children, which focused on children affected by HIV/AIDS.

The Otumfuo Education Fund has provided scholarships and other forms of educational support to large numbers of students across Ghana, particularly those from disadvantaged backgrounds. By 2019, the fund had supported hundreds of thousands of beneficiaries through full scholarships, partial financial assistance, and institutional support programmes. In addition to student support, the foundation has operated a teacher recognition scheme aimed at rewarding educators serving in under-resourced and remote communities, where access to basic amenities is limited.

Beyond formal education, the foundation has implemented initiatives to improve access to information and skills training. These have included ICT and computer literacy programmes for basic school pupils in selected districts, as well as partnerships with literacy-focused organisations to extend reading and language development programmes to public schools in underserved communities through the Otumfuo-Agroecom Mobile Library Project (OAMLP).

The foundation has also collaborated with international development organisations on youth empowerment initiatives. In 2017, it partnered with Global Communities and the Mastercard Foundation to implement the Youth Inclusive Entrepreneurial Development Initiative for Employment (YIEDIE), a multi-year programme aimed at improving employment opportunities for economically disadvantaged youth within Ghana’s construction sector.

During the COVID-19 pandemic, the foundation supported distance learning and educational continuity through the donation of books, learning materials, and the rollout of radio-based and remote learning programmes in collaboration with educational authorities and private sector partners.

In March 2021, the Otumfuo Osei Tutu II Charity Foundation, the Otumfuo Education Fund, and the Serwaa Ampem Foundation for Children were merged into a single entity and reconstituted as the Otumfuo Osei Tutu II Foundation (OOTIIF), with a new board of trustees and management structure established to consolidate its charitable operations.

== Personal life ==
=== Family ===
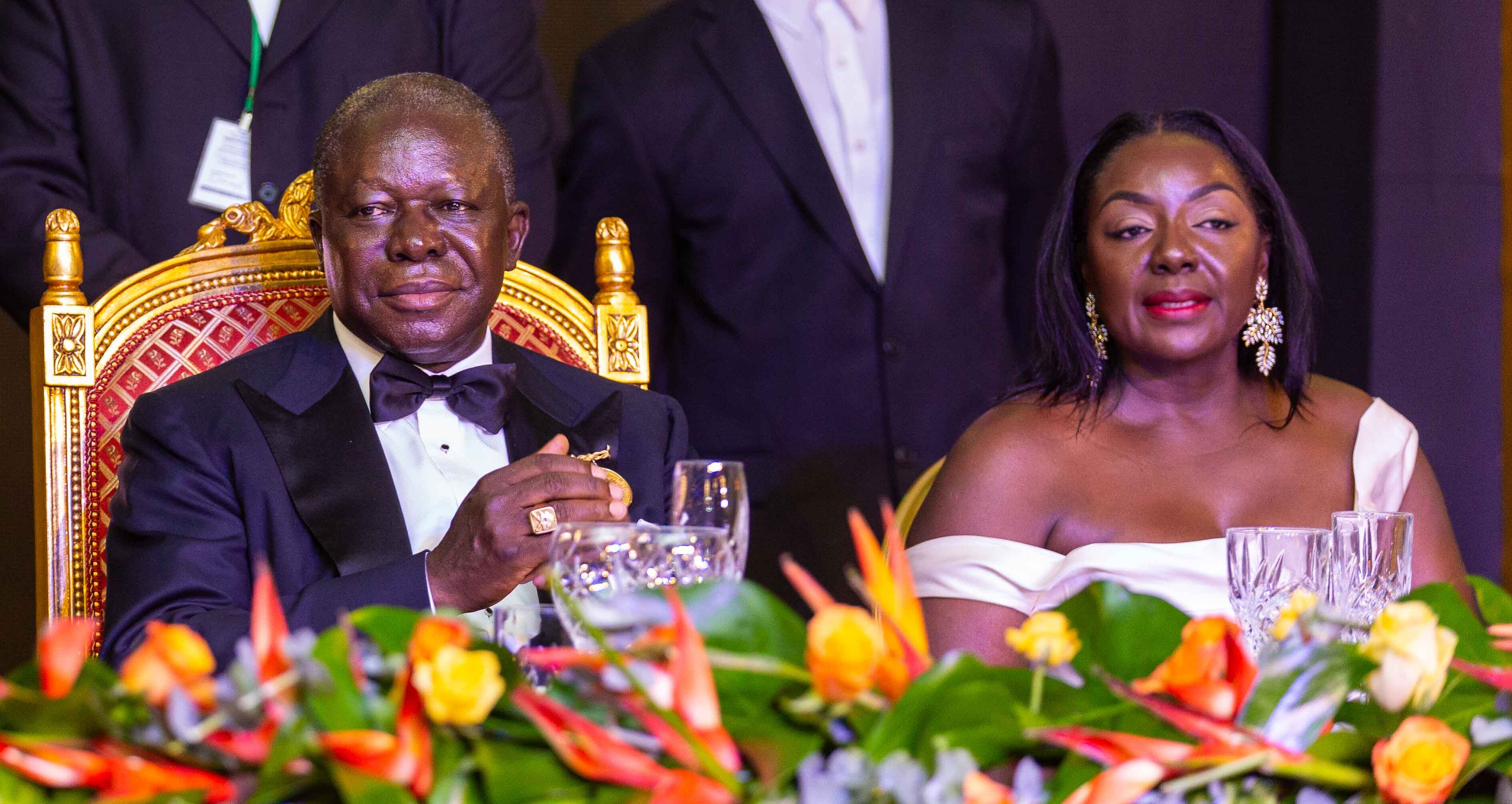
Otumfuo Osei Tutu II with his wife, Lady Julia Osei Tutu

Osei Tutu II is married to Lady Julia Osei Tutu (née Julia Ama Adwapa Amaning). The couple married in April 2002 in a traditional ceremony held in Kumasi. Lady Julia is the daughter of Stephen A. Amaning, a retired Ghanaian diplomat, and has been involved in charitable and social initiatives alongside her husband. He has seven children. He has a son named Nana Opoku Ware, who was elected the SRC President of the Ghana School of Law in 2025.

The Asantehene and his wife have two children and maintain a largely private family life, in keeping with Asante royal custom. Their first child, a daughter, Nana Afia Kobi Serwaa Ampem Osei Tutu, named after his mother and former Asantehemaa Nana Afia Kobi Ampem II, was born in June 2005. They also have a second child, a son known as Oheneba Kwame Kyeretwie. He graduated from Delhi Public School (DPS) International in Tema and was elected Head Prefect of the school. In 2025 he gained admission to study astronomy at Wesleyan University in North Carolina, United States.

=== Sports ===
Otumfuo Nana Osei Tutu II has a documented interest in golf and is recognised for his consistent advocacy for the sport’s development in Ghana. He plays golf regularly and has described the game as a means of relaxation and maintaining physical well-being alongside his responsibilities as Asantehene. His engagement with the sport is closely associated with the Royal Golf Club in Kumasi, where several major tournaments held under his patronage take place.

He has publicly encouraged the growth of golf in Ghana, calling on corporate organisations, sporting bodies and individuals to invest in the sport. In addresses delivered at various golf events, he has highlighted values associated with the sport, including discipline, integrity and strategic thinking, and has stated that golf can complement more widely followed disciplines such as football in Ghana.

Otumfuo Nana Osei Tutu II has also advocated for broader participation in golf, including youth involvement, and has urged golf clubs to modernise facilities to improve accessibility. His views on the development of the sport have been reported in national media coverage of his participation in golf tournaments and related initiatives.

He is closely associated with several prominent golf tournaments in Ghana. Otumfuo is the patron of the annual Asantehene Open Golf Championship, one of the country’s longest-running golf competitions, held at the Royal Golf Club in Kumasi. The tournament attracts professional and amateur golfers from Ghana and abroad and typically includes a ceremonial tee-off performed by the Asantehene.

He is also associated with the Stanbic–Asantehene Invitational Golf Tournament, an invitational event that brings together golfers, business leaders and public figures as part of efforts to link sports development with corporate engagement and community interaction.

In addition, Otumfuo has officiated at and supported other golf events, including charity and corporate-sponsored tournaments, as part of broader initiatives to promote golf as a recognised and viable sport in Ghana.

=== Residence ===
Otumfuo Nana Osei Tutu II resides primarily in Kumasi, in Kumasi, the capital city of Ashanti region with Manhyia Palace serving as his official residence and the administrative and ceremonial seat of the Asante Kingdom.

=== Freemasonry ===
Otumfuo Nana Osei Tutu II is a member of Freemasonry, an international fraternal organisation. He has served in several prominent positions, including Grand Patron of the Grand Lodge of Ghana, Sword Bearer of the United Grand Lodge of England , and Grand Patron of the Grand Lodge of Liberia.

== Honours and awards ==
Otumfuo Nana Osei Tutu II has received a number of academic, civic, and international honours in recognition of his contributions to traditional leadership, education, peacebuilding, cultural preservation, and national development.

In September 2024, the University of Cape Coast (UCC) conferred on him an Honorary Doctor of Laws (LLD) in acknowledgement of his role in promoting peace, unity, and socio-economic development in Ghana.

He has also received recognition from professional and civic institutions. In November 2025, the Ghana Journalists Association (GJA) honoured him for his leadership and support for the advancement of journalism in Ghana.

In recognition of his cultural and public service legacy, a commemorative gold coin was issued in his honour in 2021 to mark milestones of his reign as Asantehene.

Otumfuo Nana Osei Tutu II has additionally received ecclesiastical and international recognition, including the award of a piece of St Augustine’s Cross by the Archbishop of Canterbury in recognition of his contribution to community service and inter-institutional cooperation.

In February 2020, Otumfuo Nana Osei Tutu II became the first recipient of the Pillar of Peace Award, in recognition of his role in mediating the Dagbon chieftaincy conflict and contributing to the restoration of peace in the Dagbon Kingdom.

In 2019, he received the Chartered Institute of Marketing, Ghana (CIMG) President’s Special Award in recognition of his leadership and contribution to national development.

== Notable incidents ==
In October 2012, Otumfuo Nana Osei Tutu II attracted international media attention following the alleged theft of some Asante crown jewels from a hotel in Oslo, Norway, where he was attending a conference. The items were reported missing from a hotel safe, prompting an investigation by Norwegian authorities. The incident received coverage from international media outlets due to the cultural and historical significance of the artefacts.
