= List of public transport routes numbered 2 =

In public transport, Route 2 may refer to:

- Barcelona Metro line 2
- NWFB Route 2 in Hong Kong
- London Buses route 2
- Line 2 (Madrid Metro)
- Line 2 Orange (Montreal Metro)
- 2 (New York City Subway service)
- Seoul Subway Line 2
- Shanghai Metro Line 2

== See also ==
- Line 2 (disambiguation)
