= Two two =

Two two may refer to:

- Two Two (투투), a Korean pop group
- Jacob Two-Two, a fictional character in several books, films, and a TV series

== See also ==
- 2 (disambiguation)
- 2+2 (disambiguation)
- 2/2 (disambiguation)
- Tootoo
- Tutu (disambiguation)
- Two & Two (2011 film)
- Two by Two (disambiguation)
- Two by Twos
- Two for Two
- Two Two Two
