= Tue =

Tue or TUE may refer to:

== Science and technology ==
- Technische Universiteit Eindhoven, Eindhoven University of Technology, the Netherlands
- Therapeutic Use Exemption, of drugs in sport
- Tue iron or tuyere

== People ==
- Tue Bjørn Thomsen (1972–2006), Danish boxer
- Tue Greenfort (born 1973), Danish artist
- Tue Hellstem (born 1961), Danish pentathlete, competed at the 1988 Olympics
- Tue Lassen, orienteer, competed at the 2013 World Games
- Tue Trung (1230–1291), medieval Buddhist teacher
- Tue West (born 1977), Danish composer

== Places ==
- Tue Brook, a stream in Liverpool, England
  - Tue Brook House
  - Tue Brook railway station
- Tue Marshes Light, a lighthouse in Virginia, US
- Tue, a barangay in the municipality of Tadian in Mountain Province, Philippines

== Other uses ==
- Tuesday (short form)
- Tuyuca language (ISO 639 code: tue)

== See also ==
- Tue Rechnung! Donnerwort, BWV 168, a Bach cantata
- To (disambiguation)
- Too (disambiguation)
- Two (disambiguation)
