= Tutu (clothing) =

Dress used in ballet

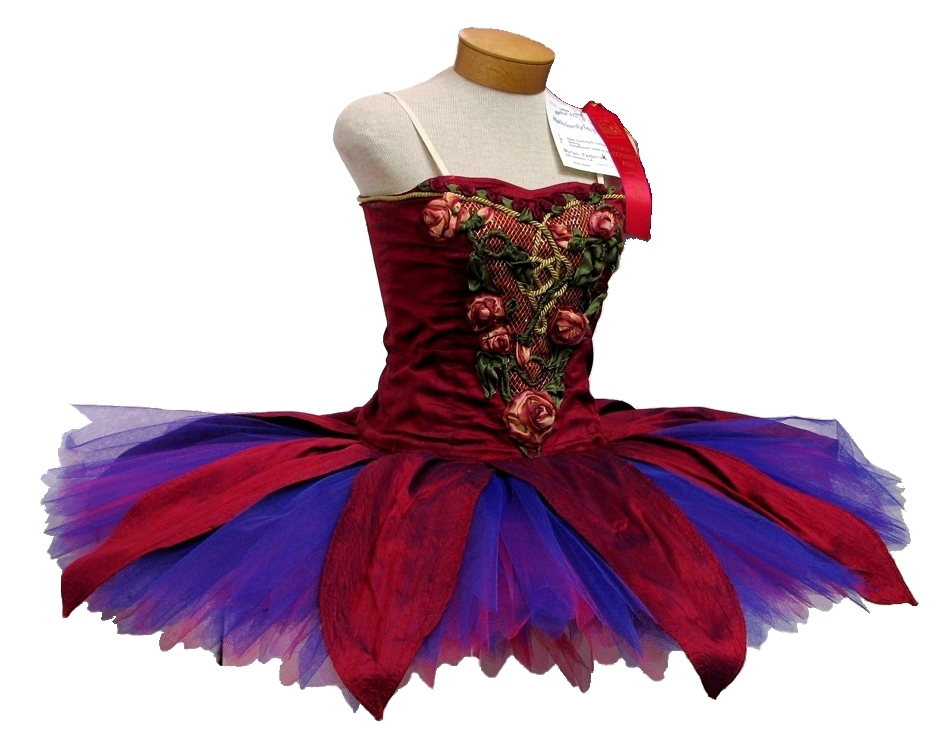
A colourfully decorated classical ballet tutu, on a dress form

A tutu is a dress worn as a costume in a classical ballet performance, often with attached bodice. It may be made of tarlatan, muslin, silk, tulle, gauze, or nylon. Modern tutus have two basic types: the Romantic tutu is soft and bell-shaped, reaching the calf or ankle; the Classical tutu is short and stiff, projecting horizontally from the waist and hip.

== Etymology ==
The word tutu can refer to only the skirt part of the costume. The bodice and tutu make up what is usually the entire costume, but which is called the tutu (by synecdoche, wherein the part – the skirt – can embody the whole).

The derivation of the word tutu is unknown. The word was not recorded anywhere until 1881. One theory is that it is simply derived from the word tulle (one of the materials from which it is made).

A second theory is that the word comes from the slang of French children that refers to the buttocks (cul). During that era, the abonnés (rich male subscribers at the Paris Opera Ballet) were accustomed to mix with the ballet girls in the foyer and arrange assignations. It is suggested the expression came from the abonnés playfully patting the back of the tulle dress with the saying pan-pan cucul (French for I'll spank your bottom).

A third, related theory suggests a derivation from the more vulgar French word cul (which can be used to refer to the bottom or genital area). During this era, women (including dancers) wore pantalettes as underwear, which were open at the crotch. The abonnés favoured the very front rows in the hope of a scandalous view, and the skirt was modified for that reason. This is supported by the description by nineteenth-century balletomane, Charles Nuitter, who defined tutu as "a slang term for the very short petticoat worn by danseuses in the interest of modesty."

According to Etimonline, tutu first appeared in 1910 and is derived from the French tutu, which in turn was derived from the French cucu, in turn derived from the French cul meaning a bottom or backside. Similarly, Merriam-Webster claims that the word first appeared in 1913 and that it is derived from the French tutu which is babytalk for a backside.

== History ==
Marie Taglioni (1829) is believed to be the first person to sport the tutu, but the first designs of tutus actually originated two years before Taglioni performed on stage. Hippolyte Lecomte designed the basic silhouette of the Romantic tutu for Pauline Montessu in La Somnambule (1827); Taglioni's Sylphide costume's designs were not actually found. Ivor Guest points out the costume is very similar to what ballerinas would wear in class. The part of Creuse in Noverre's ballet Jason et Medée was danced by Mlle Guimard who wore a pale dress in 1770. The La Sylphide tutu may have been inspired by the use of muslin petticoats to give the skirt volume instead of using the usual hoops.

Towards the end of the 18th century, female dresses had higher waistlines and became slimmer as well; dancers appeared to begin dancing without panniers (hips hoops to accentuate skirt designs) for a more natural theme that displayed the human body and allowed more freedom in movements. These translated well in costumes in order to accent the lines of the dancers. Skin-colored tights were also worn with these evolved form-fitting costumes to preserve modesty, but replace the unseemly shapes of knickers.

However, the skirt that became known specifically as the romantic tutu made its first appearance in 1832 at the Paris Opera, where Marie Taglioni wore a gauzy white skirt cut to reveal her ankles, designed by Eugene Lami in La Sylphide. From the late 19th century onwards, the tutu was steadily shortened, for ease of movement and to show off the dancer's legs. Romantic tutus were effective in portraying the ethereal creatures that exist in many ballet repertoires, but as ballet became more modernized, the flouncy but stiff tutus would be replaced by softer more relaxed skirts. The traditional tutu is a symbol of historical dance and its past.

During the twentieth century, the tutu reached its peak form with a platelike shape; French critic André Levinson highlighted the contrast between the stiff and immobile features of the skirt and the energetic and alive movements of the dancers. The tutu's simple design and timeless class are the product of countless adaptations to finally present the dancer in a flattering light.

Oftentimes, tutus and costumes evolved alongside fashion during their respective eras. Skirts became shorter, fuller, and necklines were even lowered in the 1870s to display "sexual attractiveness." Fashion designers have often been involved in design for ballet. Fashion designers including Cecil Beaton, Christian Lacroix, and Isaac Mizrahi in the United States have all designed tutus. Among the leading makers of tutus around the world, few designers have matched the reputation of Barbara Karinska (1886–1983), the Ukrainian-born costumer for the New York City Ballet for many years, She designed and constructed tutus of extraordinary beauty and durability.

== Styles ==
The Romantic tutu is still based on Marie Taglioni's original costume, though modern materials mean it is lighter and may be more transparent. The hem falls between the knee and ankle.

The inverted bell tutu is midway between the classical tutu and the Romantic tutu. It is made of several layers of tulle which jut out similar to a classical tutu, but the layers are longer and have a downward droop, usually to mid-thigh.

There are several versions of the modern tutu:

Classical tutu: a skirt made of 10-12 layers of stiff tulle sewn on to a pantie and basque at hip level. The lower, short layers of tulle support the top layers, making them jut out from the hip.

Pancake tutu: this tutu is supported by a hoop and is very flat, with few ruffles.

Platter tutu: similar to the pancake tutu but sitting at the waist instead of the hip.

American tutu (also known as the Balanchine, Karinska or powderpuff tutu): Very short ruffles of tulle are loosely sewn on to a pantie to give a soft effect.

== Image gallery ==
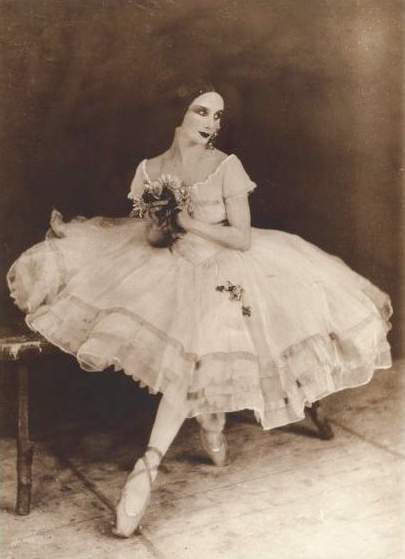
Anna Pavlova in Giselle, wearing a romantic tutu

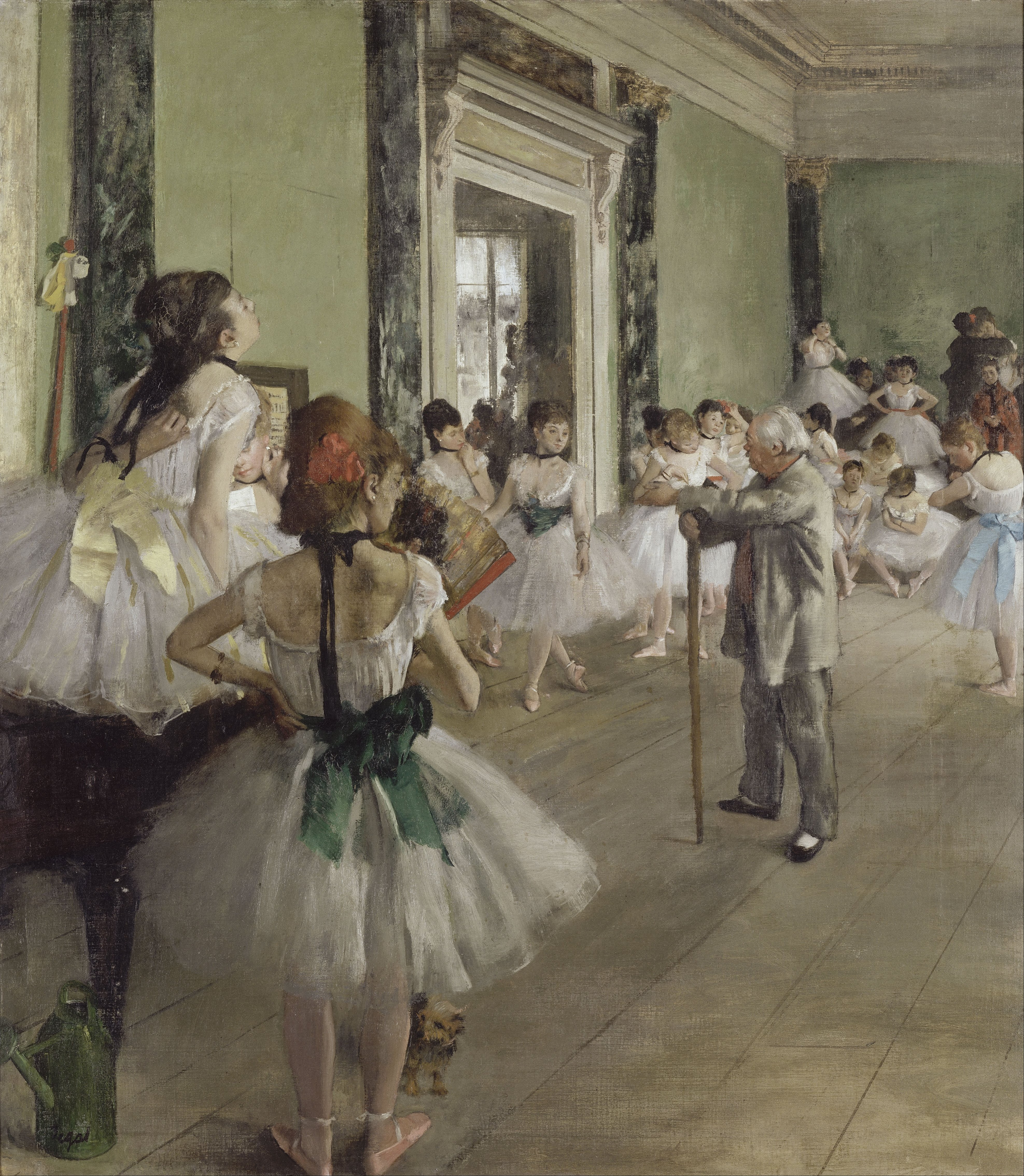
Classical bell tutus in The Dance Class by Edgar Degas, 1874

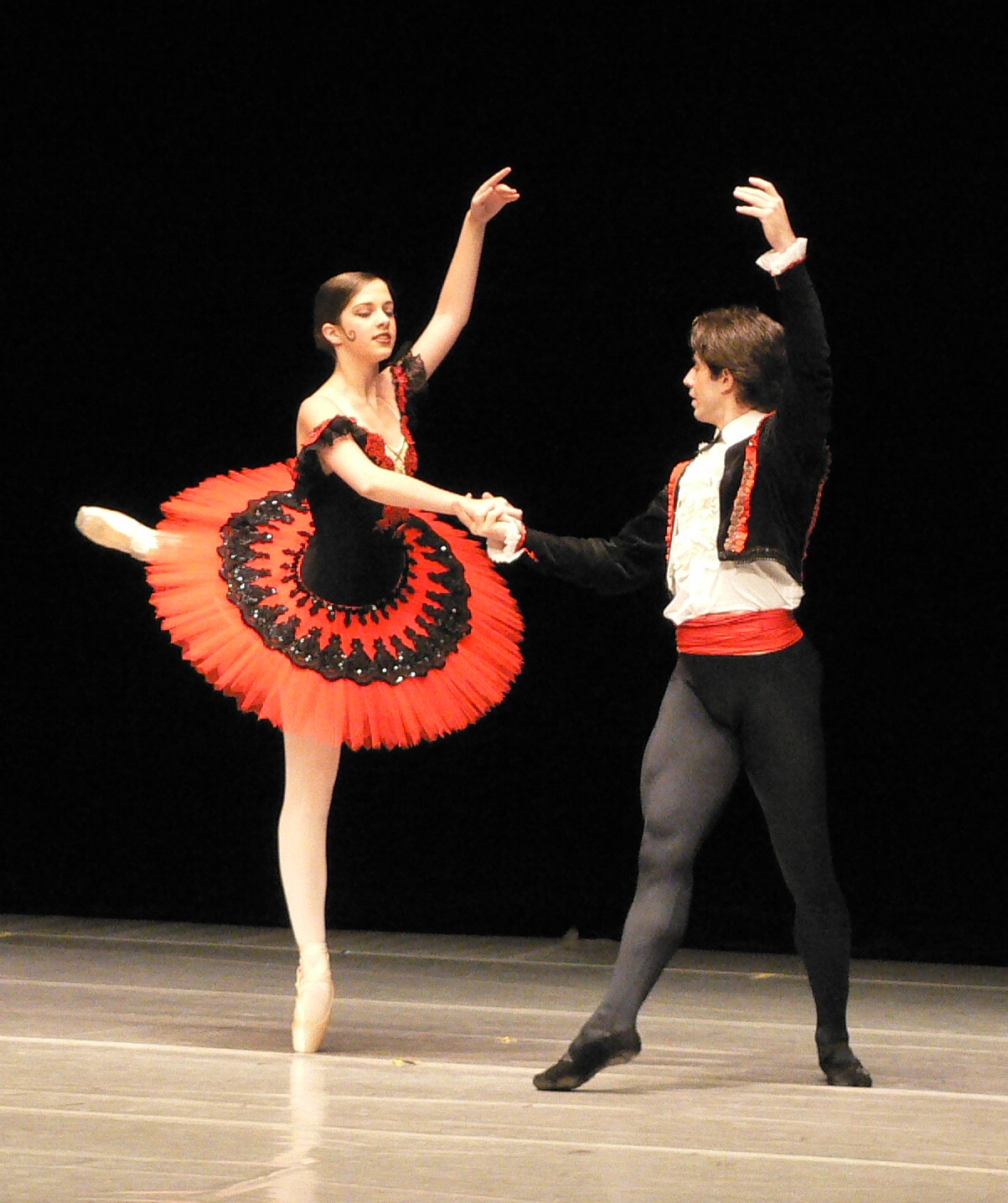
Dancer wearing a pancake tutu in the Grand Pas de deux from Don Quixote

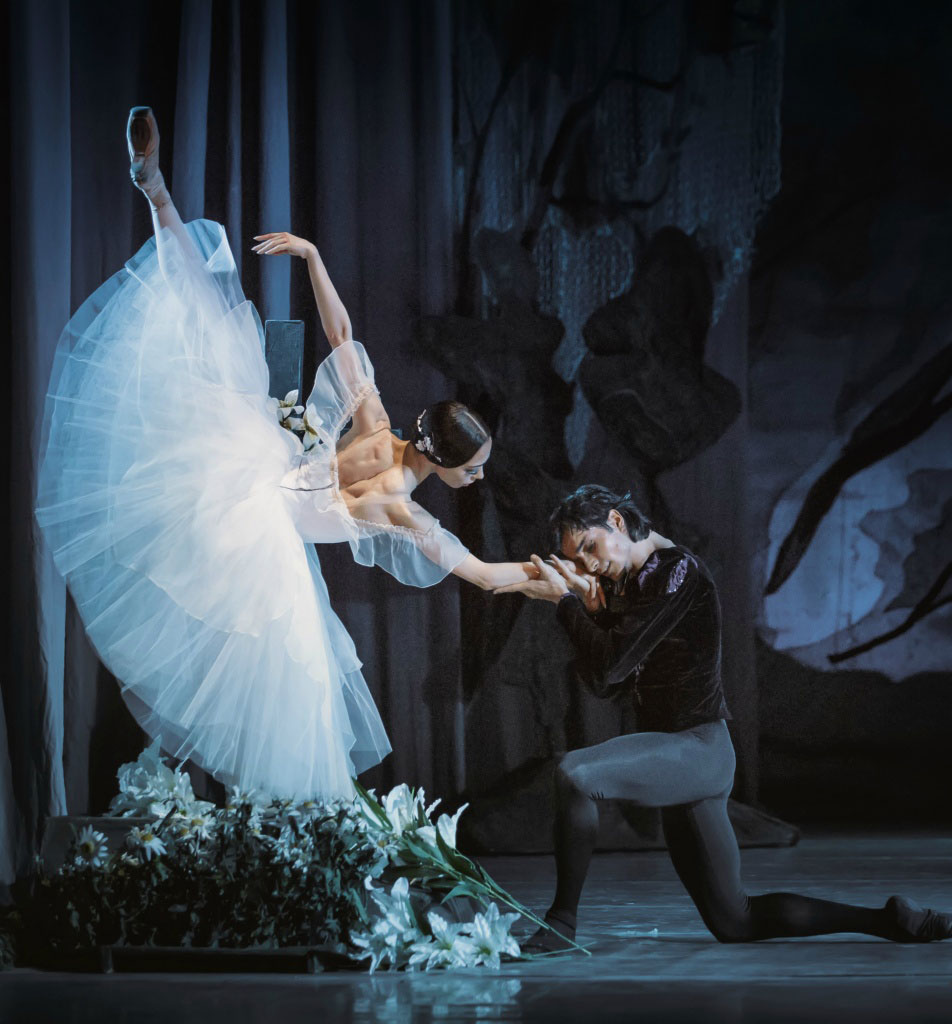
Kateryna Kukhar wearing a Romantic tutu in a scene from Giselle

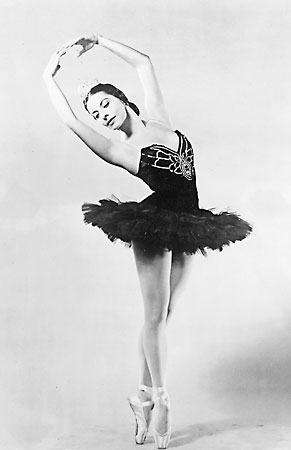
Alicia Alonso wearing a pancake tutu, 1955

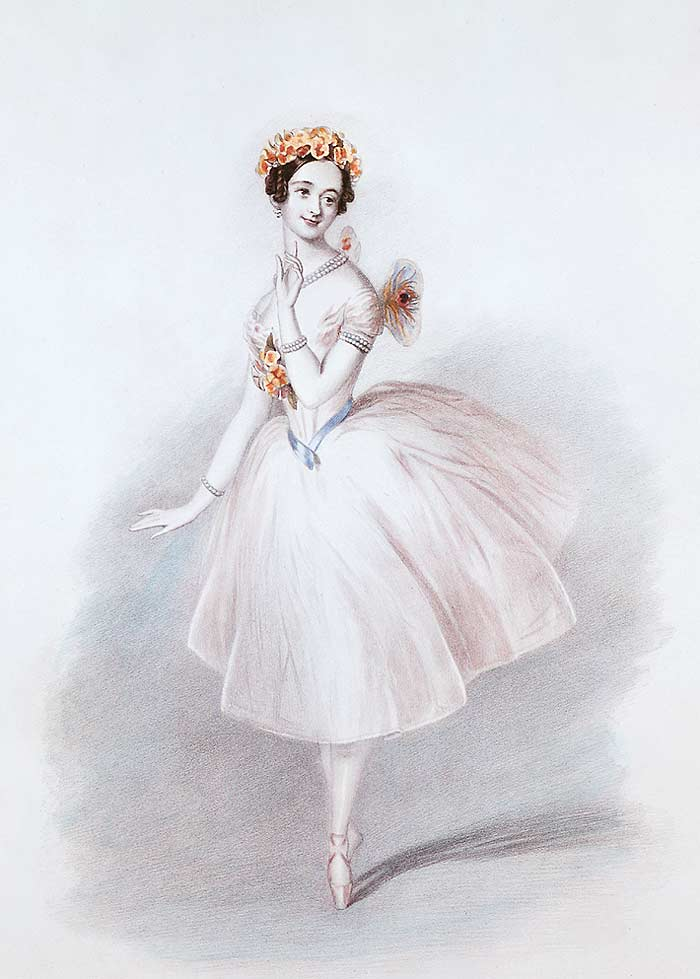
Marie Taglioni wearing a Romantic tutu

== See also ==
- Ballerina skirt
