= Number Two =

Number Two, No. 2, or similar may refer to:

== Film ==
- No. 2 (film), a 2006 New Zealand film
  - No. 2: Original Motion Picture Soundtrack, the soundtrack to the film
- Number Two (film), a 1975 film directed by Jean-Luc Godard
- Jackass Number Two, 2006
- Dui Number (film) (translation of Number Two), a 2006 Bangladeshi film featuring Shakib Khan

== Characters ==
- Number Two (The Prisoner), a character from the British television series The Prisoner
- Number Two (Battlestar Galactica) or Leoben Conoy, a character from the 2004 TV series
- Numbuh Two, a character from the animated television series Codename: Kids Next Door
- Number 2, a character in the Austin Powers series of films
- Number two, a character from The Hitchhiker's Guide to the Galaxy by Douglas Adams

== Music ==
Bands and artists

- No. 2 (band), an American alternative rock band
- Paul Gray (American musician) (1972–2010), who used the pseudonym #2

Albums

- N° 2, a 1959 Serge Gainsbourg album
- 2 (Mac DeMarco album), Mac DeMarco's 2012 debut album
- #2 (Thees Uhlmann album), 2013

Songs

- "Number 2" (KSI song), 2021
- "Number 2" (Lil Tecca song), 2024
- "Number Two", a 2008 song by They Might Be Giants from the album Here Come the 123s
- "Number Two", a 2012 song by My Chemical Romance from the album Conventional Weapons

== Other uses ==
- 2, the natural number
- (To go) number 2, a slang term for defecation
- No. 2 fuel oil or No. 2 diesel fuel
- "Number two", a term for a curveball in baseball

== See also ==
- 2 (disambiguation)
