= Tutu =

Tutu may refer to:

- Tutu (clothing), a dress worn as a costume in a ballet performance
- Tutu (name), including a list of people with that name

== Arts and entertainment ==
- Tutu (album), by Miles Davis, 1986
- "Tutu" (song), a 2019 song by Camilo and Pedro Capó
- "Tutu", a 2020 song by 6ix9ine from TattleTales
- "Tūtū", a composition by Liliuokalani
- Princess Tutu, an anime series, and its title character
- Tutu, the wife of Tottles, a Lewis Carroll fictional character
- Tutu (painting), by Ben Enwonwu

== Places ==
- Tutu, U.S. Virgin Islands, a subdistrict on Saint Thomas Island
- Tutu Island, in the Arno Atoll of the Marshall Islands
- Tūtū, or Rabiabad, a village in South Khorasan Province, Iran
- Tuţu, a village in Corbița, Vrancea County, Romania

== Other uses ==
- Tutu (Egyptian god), during the Late Period
- Tutu (Egyptian official), one of pharaoh's officials during the Amarna letters period
- Tutu (Mesopotamian god), a creation god
- Tutu (plant), poisonous New Zealand plants of the genus Coriaria

== See also ==
- TU (disambiguation)
- Two two (disambiguation)
- Osei Tutu, founder of the Ashanti Empire
- Tootoo, an Inuit surname
- Tututni, a Native American tribe
