= 2 Train =

2 Train can refer to:

- 2 (New York City Subway service)
- Orange Line (Montreal Metro), also known as Line 2
- Paris Metro Line 2
- Line 2, Beijing Subway
- Line 2, Shanghai Metro
- Line 2, Toronto Subway
- Edward the Blue Engine (Little kids about 4 and under will sometimes call Edward "2 train")

== See also ==
- Line 2 (disambiguation)
