= Tootoosis =

Tootoosis is a surname of Plains Cree origin.

Tootoosis may refer to:

- Gordon Tootoosis (1941-2011), Canadian First Nations actor
- John Tootoosis (1899-1989), Canadian Cree leader
- Tyrone Tootoosis (1958-2017), Canadian First Nations activist and Cree cultural caretaker
