= Line 2 =

Line 2 or 2 Line may refer to:

== Public transport ==
=== Americas ===
- 2 (New York City Subway service), a rapid transit service in the A Division of the New York City Subway
- 2 Line (Sound Transit), a light rail line in Seattle, Washington
- Line 2 Bloor–Danforth, a subway line in Toronto
- Line 2 (Rio de Janeiro), a metro line in Brazil
- Line 2 (Rio LRT), one of the lines of VLT Carioca
- Line 2 (São Paulo Metro), one of the metro lines making up the São Paulo Metro
- Line 2 of the Guadalajara urban rail system, Mexico
- Mexico City Metro Line 2, a rapid transit line in Mexico City
- Mexico City Metrobús Line 2, a bus rapid transit line in Mexico City
- Line 2 (O-Train), a diesel light rail line in Ottawa
- Orange Line (Montreal Metro), also known as Line 2
- 2 (Los Angeles Railway), former streetcar service

=== Asia ===
- Green Line (Kolkata Metro), a metro line in India
- Yellow Line (Mumbai Metro), a metro line in India
- Aqua Line (Pune Metro), a planned line in India
- Line 2 (Riyadh Metro), in Saudi Arabia
- MRT Line 2 (Dhaka Metro Rail), a proposed line in Bangladesh
- MRT Line 2 (Jakarta Mass Rapid Transit), a planned line in Indonesia
- Manila Light Rail Transit System Line 2, a line in Metro Manila, Philippines
- Tanjung Malim–Port Klang Line, formerly Port Klang Line, Malaysia
- Putrajaya Line, or MRT Line 2, Malaysia
- Busan Metro Line 2, in South Korea
- Daegu Metro Line 2, in South Korea
- Incheon Subway Line 2, in South Korea
- Seoul Subway Line 2, a circular line in Seoul, South Korea
- Tamsui-Xinyi line, in Taipei metropolitan area, Taiwan

==== China ====
- Line 2 (Beijing Subway), a subway line in Beijing
- Line 2 (Changchun Rail Transit), a subway line in Changchun, Jilin
- Line 2 (Changsha Metro), a metro line in Changsha, Hunan
- Line 2 (Changzhou Metro), a metro line in Changzhou, Jiangsu
- Line 2 (Chengdu Metro), a metro line in Chengdu, Sichuan
- Line 2 (Chengdu Tram), a tram line in Chengdu, Sichuan
- Line 2 (Chongqing Rail Transit), a monorail line in Chongqing
- Line 2 (Dalian Metro), a metro line in Dalian, Liaoning
- Line 2 (Dongguan Rail Transit), a metro line in Dongguan, Guangdong
- Line 2 (Foshan Metro), a metro line in Foshan, Guangdong
- Line 2 (Fuzhou Metro), a metro line in Fuzhou, Fujian
- Line 2 (Guangzhou Metro), a metro line in Guangzhou, Guangdong
- Line 2 (Guangzhou Huangpu Tram), a tram line in Guangzhou, Guangdong
- Line 2 (Guiyang Metro), a metro line in Guiyang, Guizhou
- Line 2 (Hangzhou Metro), a metro line in Hangzhou, Zhejiang
- Line 2 (Harbin Metro), a metro line in Harbin, Heilongjiang
- Line 2 (Hefei Metro), a metro line in Hefei, Anhui
- Line 2 (Hohhot Metro), a metro line in Hohhot, Inner Mongolia
- Line 2 (Jinan Metro), a metro line in Jinan, Shandong
- Line 2 (Kunming Metro), a metro line in Kunming, Yunnan
- Line 2 (Lanzhou Metro), a metro line in Lanzhou, Gansu
- Line 2 (Luoyang Subway), a subway line in Luoyang, Henan
- Line 2 (Nanchang Metro), a metro line in Nanchang, Jiangxi
- Line 2 (Nanjing Metro), a metro line in Nanjing, Jiangsu
- Line 2 (Nanning Metro), a metro line in Nanning, Guangxi
- Line 2 (Ningbo Rail Transit), a metro line in Ningbo, Zhejiang
- Line 2 (Qingdao Metro), a metro line in Qingdao, Shandong
- Line 2 (Shanghai Metro), a metro line in Shanghai
- Line 2 (Shenyang Metro), a metro line in Shenyang, Liaoning
- Line 2 (Shenzhen Metro), a metro line in Shenzhen, Guangdong
- Line 2 (Shijiazhuang Metro), a metro line in Shijiazhuang, Hebei
- Line 2 (Suzhou Metro), a metro line in Suzhou, Jiangsu
- Line 2 (Taiyuan Metro), a metro line in Taiyuan, Shanxi
- Line 2 (Tianjin Metro), a metro line in Tianjin
- Line 2 (Wuhan Metro), a metro line in Wuhan, Hubei
- Line 2 (Wuhu Rail Transit), a monorail line in Wuhu, Anhui
- Line 2 (Wuxi Metro), a metro line in Wuxi, Jiangsu
- Line 2 (Xiamen Metro), a metro line in Xiamen, Fujian
- Line 2 (Xi'an Metro), a metro line in Xi'an, Shaanxi
- Line 2 (Xuzhou Metro), a metro line in Xuzhou, Jiangsu
- Line 2 (Zhengzhou Metro), a metro line in Zhengzhou, Henan
- Taipei Metro Line 2, Tamsui–Xinyi or Red line, a metro line in Taipei, Taiwan

=== Europe ===
- Île-de-France tramway Line 2, part of the modern tram network of the Île-de-France region of France
- Line 2 (Athens Metro), a metro line of the Athens Metro, Athens, Greece
- Line 2 (Budapest Metro), a subway line of the Budapest Metro, Budapest, Hungary
- Line 2 (Bilbao Metro), a metro line of the Bilbao Metro, Bilbao, Spain
- Line 2 (Metrovalencia), a partially completed metro and tram line covering the city of Valencia, Spain
- Line 2 (Moscow Metro) or Zamoskvoretskaya line, a metro line in Russia
- Line 2 (Naples), a metro line in Naples, Italy
- Line 2 (Nizhny Novgorod Metro), a partly opened line in Russia
- Paris Metro Line 2, a metro line of the Paris Metro, Paris, France
- Line 2 (Saint Petersburg Metro), a metro line of the Saint Petersburg Metro, Saint Petersburg, Russia
- Line 2 (Thessaloniki Metro), a deep-level underground rapid transit line in Greece
- U2 (Vienna U-Bahn), a subway line of Vienna U-Bahn, Vienna, Austria

=== Oceania ===
==== Australia ====
- L2 Randwick Line, light rail line in Sydney, New South Wales
- T2 Inner West & Leppington Line, Sydney Trains service, New South Wales

== Politics ==
- A "two-line whip", an application of a Whip in politics (see Chief Whip for details)
- "Option 2" (Linje 2) of the 1980 Swedish nuclear power referendum

== See also ==
- Second line (disambiguation)
- 2 Train (disambiguation)
- List of public transport routes numbered 2
