= 2002 Dagbon chieftaincy crisis =

Conflict in Ghana

The 2002 Dagbon chieftaincy crisis, also known as the Yendi conflict, was a clash between two feuding factions that occurred at the Gbewaa Palace, Ghana from March 25–27, 2002. It resulted in the killing of Yaa Naa Yakubu II and 40 of his elders.

== Committee of Eminent Chiefs ==
The Committee of Eminent Chiefs is a three-member committee of Ghanaian traditional rulers formed by the Government of Ghana to intervene the Dagbon chieftaincy crisis.
