= Second Avenue Line =

Second Avenue Line may refer to the following transit lines in New York City:

- Second Avenue Line (surface) (M15 local and Select Bus Service, formerly a streetcar route)
- IRT Second Avenue Line (former elevated railway)
- Second Avenue Subway, subway line
