= Oil Spill Eater II =

Substance used to treat oil spills

Oil Spill Eater II is a biocatalytic system of multi-enzyme liquid concentrate used to treat oil spills. When combined with fresh or salt water and oxygen, it will cause crude oil and other organic substances to rapidly decompose, eventually biodegrading them to carbon dioxide and water. As the biosurfactants do their job, the enzymes attach themselves to broken-down hydrocarbon structures, forming digestive binding sites.
