= Haima 2 =

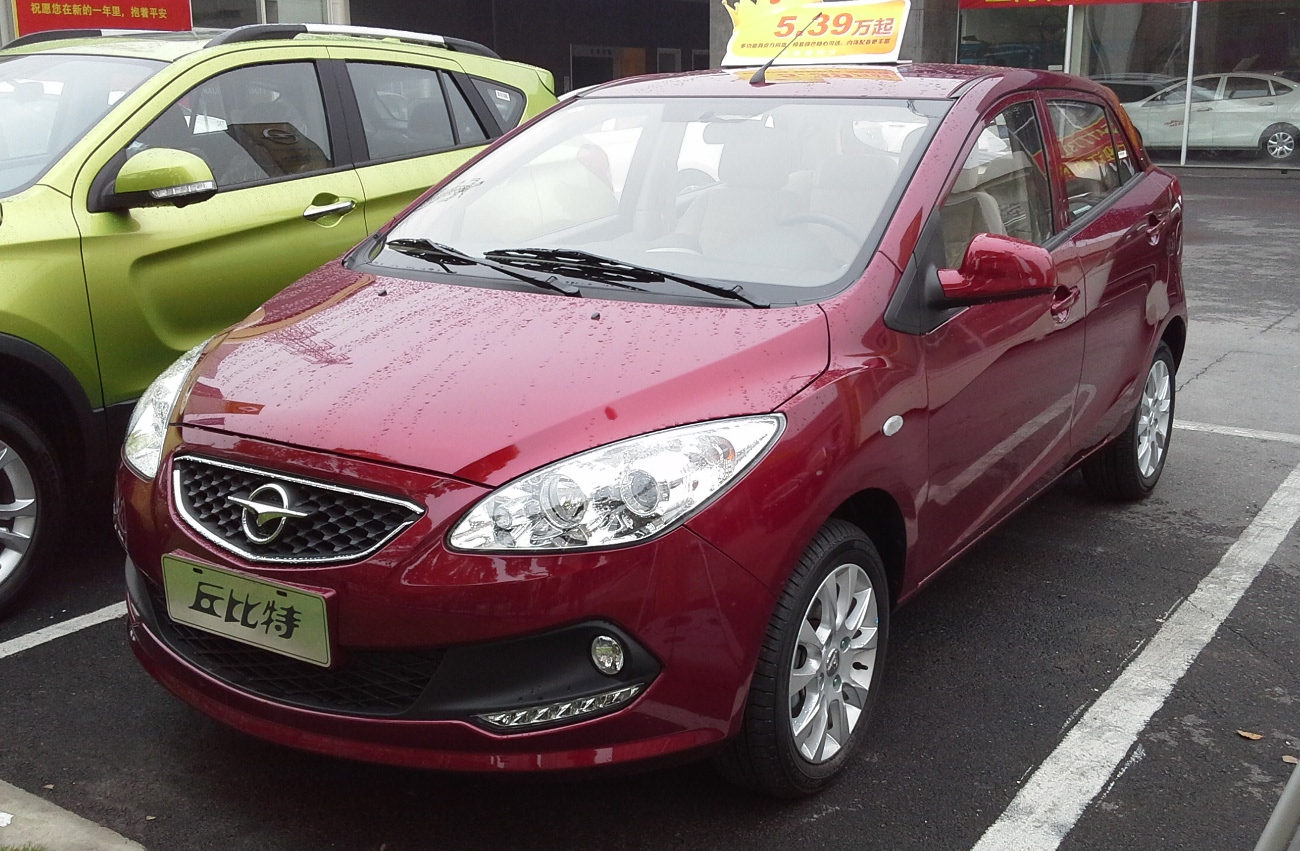

Overview
- Manufacturer: Haima Automobile
- Also called: Haima 2 Qiubite (Cupid)
- Production: 2009–2015
- Assembly: China: Hainan

Body and chassis
- Class: Subcompact car (B)
- Body style: 5-door hatchback
- Layout: Front-engine, front-wheel-drive

Powertrain
- Engine: 1.3 L 4A90 I4 (gasoline); 1.5 L 4A91 I4 (gasoline)
- Transmission: 5-speed manual; 6-speed automatic

Dimensions
- Wheelbase: 2,500 mm (98.4 in)
- Length: 3,890 mm (153.1 in)
- Width: 1,695 mm (66.7 in)
- Height: 1,480 mm (58.3 in)
- Curb weight: 1,055 kg (2,325.9 lb)

The Haima 2 is a subcompact car produced by Haima.

== Overview ==
The styling of the Haima 2 heavily resembles the second-generation Mazda2, and could be easily mistaken as a product of Haima's former joint venture partner due to its styling. A 1.3 or 1.5 liter engine was available paired to a 5-speed manual or a 6-speed Getrag automatic transmission. Prices starts from 53,900 yuan to 68,900 yuan.

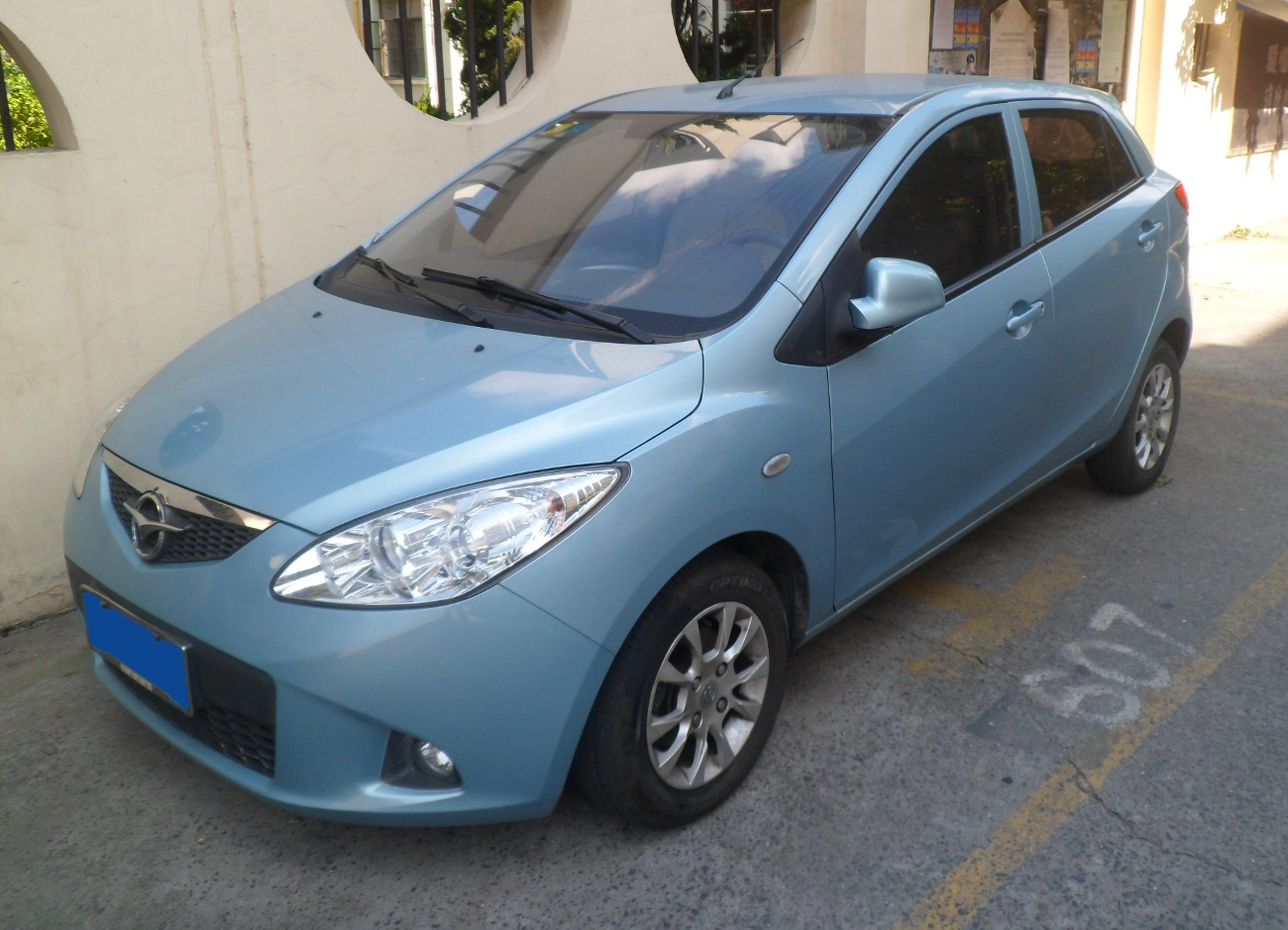
Haima 2 (pre-facelift)

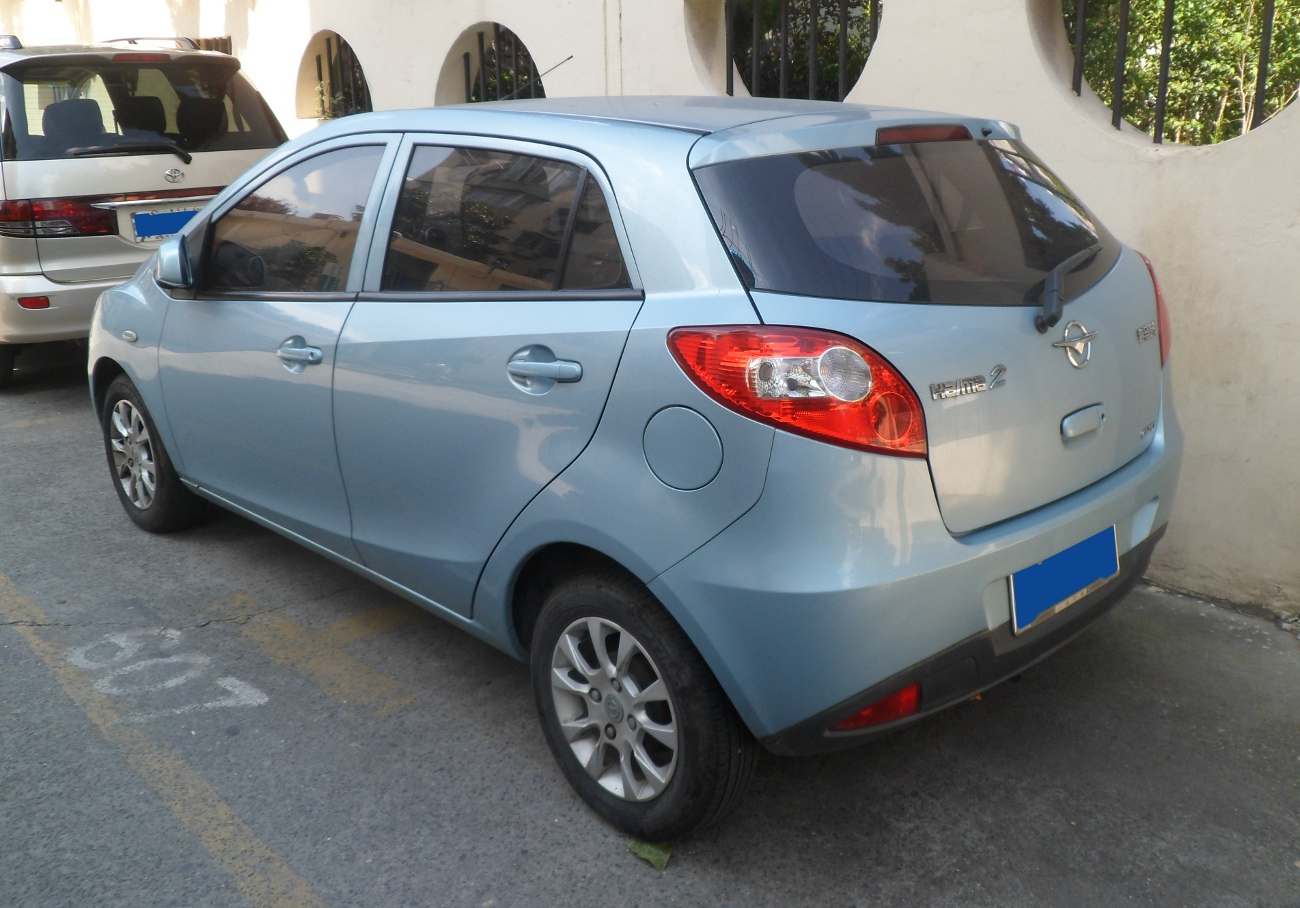
Rear view

=== 2013 facelift ===
A facelift in 2013 mainly changed the styling of the front and rear bumpers.

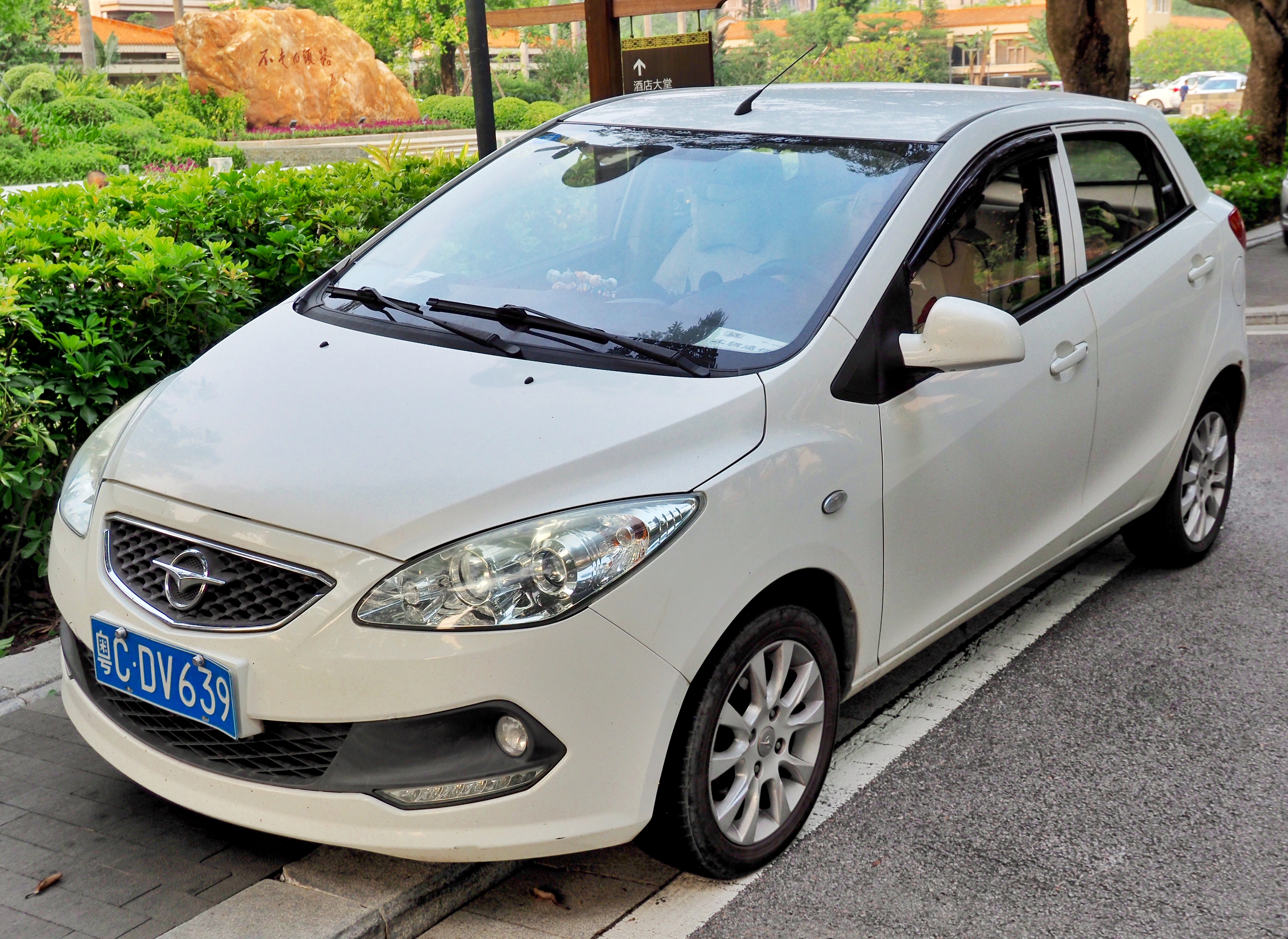
Haima 2 2013 (facelift)

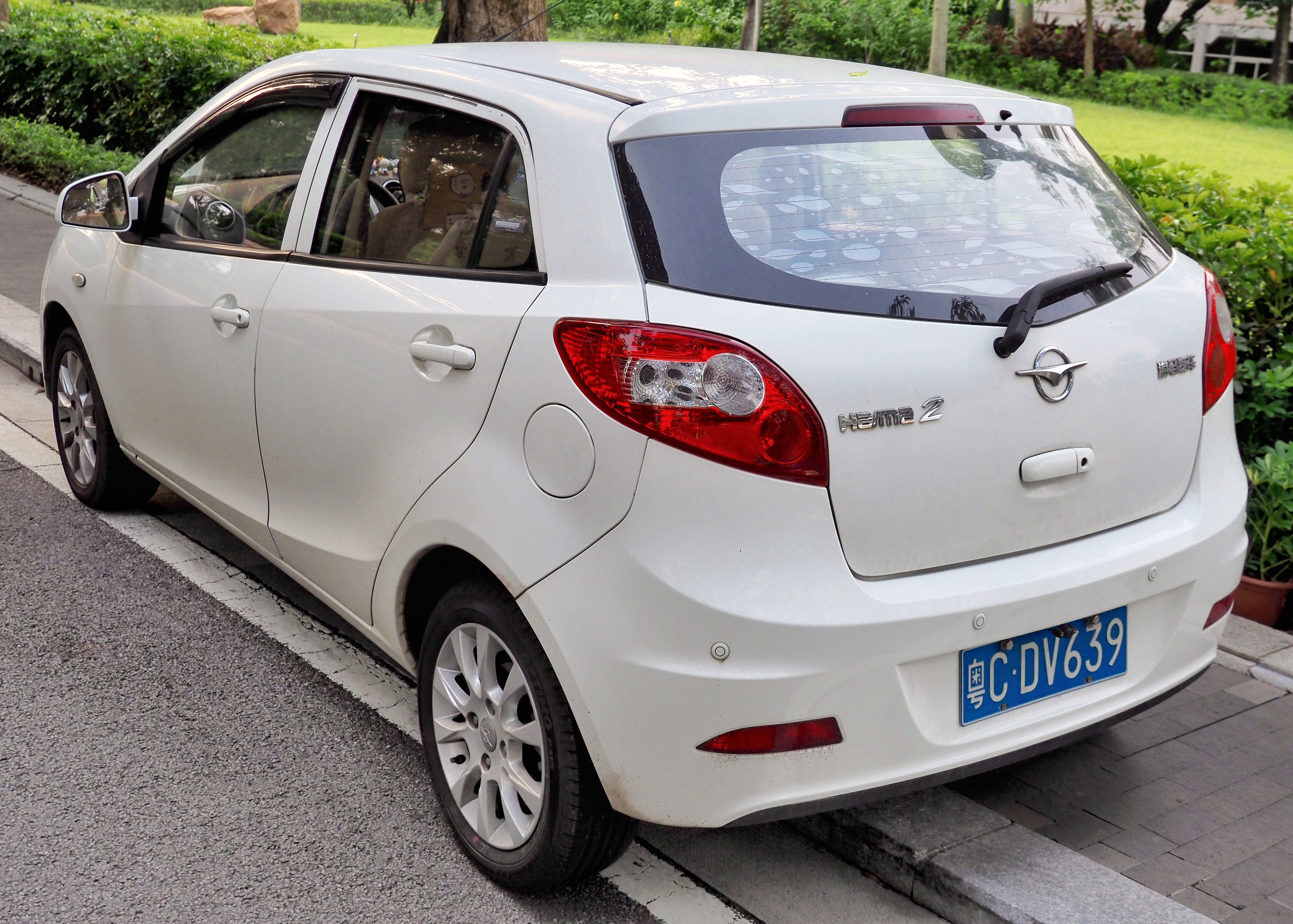
Rear view
