= Julia Osei Tutu =

Wife of Asantehene, Otumfuo Nana Osei Tutu II

Otumfuo-Yere Julia Osei Tutu
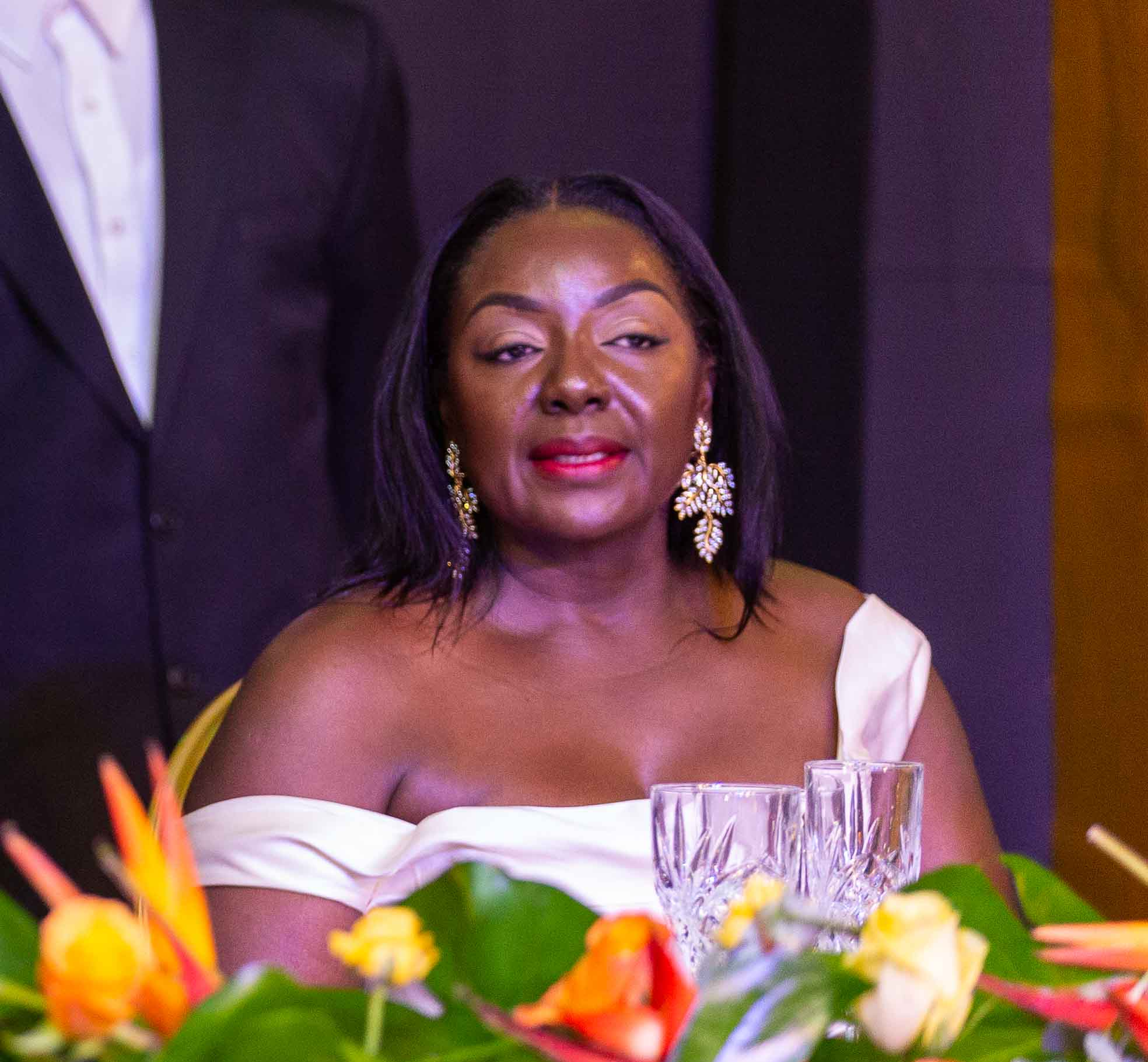
- Julia in 2019

Consort of the Asantehene
- Tenure: April 2002 – present
- Born: Julia Ama Adwapa Amaning
- Spouse: Otumfuo Nana Osei Tutu II (m. 2002)
- Issue: Nana Afia Kobi Serwaa Ampem Osei Tutu; Oheneba Kwame Kyeretwie
- House: Oyoko Dynasty (by marriage)
- Father: Stephen Amaning
- Mother: Ernestina Amaning (aka Otumfuo-Ase)

Otumfuo-Yere Julia Osei Tutu (born Julia Ama Adwapa Amaning on 14 December) is the wife of Asantehene Otumfuo Nana Osei Tutu II, ruler of the Asante Kingdom.

== Early life ==
Julia Osei Tutu was born as Julia Ama Adwapa Amaning, the last of five children born to Stephen A. Amaning, a retired career diplomat and Ernestina A. Amaning.

A daughter of Akyem Abuakwa in the Eastern Region, Lady Julia and Otumfuo Nana Osei Tutu II married in April 2002. She is a member of the Oyoko dynasty by marriage. The Asantehene and his wife have two children and maintain a largely private family life, in keeping with Asante royal custom. Their first child, a daughter, Nana Afia Kobi Serwaa Ampem Osei Tutu, named after the Asantehene's mother and former Asantehemaa Nana Afia Kobi Ampem II, was born in June 2005. They also have a second child, a son known as Oheneba Kwame Kyeretwie. He graduated from Delhi Public School (DPS) International in Tema and was elected Head Prefect of the school. In 2025 he gained admission to study astronomy at Wesleyan University in North Carolina, United States.

== Education ==
Lady Julia received her primary education at schools in London, Accra and in Berne, Switzerland, until 1982, after which she entered Wesley Girls' High School in Cape Coast for her secondary school education, where she obtained her 'O' Level Certificate in 1986 and 'A' Level Certificate in 1988.

In 1989, Lady Julia entered the Faculty of Law at the University of Ghana, Legon and obtained a Bachelor of Law Degree with honours, LL.B. (Hons.) in 1992. She continued her law studies at the Ghana School of Law, Accra, where she completed the Professional Law Course and was called to the Ghana Bar in 1994.

On completion of the Professional Law Course, she served as a teaching assistant in international law at the Faculty of Law of the University of Ghana for a year and also undertook private practice at the Law Offices of Agyemang and Associates, a law firm in Accra.

In September 1995, Lady Julia Osei Tutu was admitted for postgraduate studies at Queen's University, Kingston, Ontario, Canada, and obtained a Master of Laws (LL.M) in international humanitarian law, after which she served as an intern with Amnesty International's United Nations Office in New York.

== Work ==
In 1998, she returned to Ghana and joined Standard Chartered Ghana Limited as legal and corporate affairs officer. She was also, until March 2002, secretary to the National Partnership for Children's Trust, which trust is concerned with the promotion of the welfare of children in Ghana. She is also a patron of the Otumfuo Charity Foundation.

Lady Julia speaks Twi, English and French.
