= 2x2 Project =

Organization

The 2x2 Project
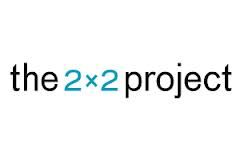
- Formation: 2012
- Type: Public health news and analysis
- Legal status: active
- Purpose: Health news and information that is accessible, accurate and engages the general public.
- Headquarters: New York City, New York
- Location: Department of Epidemiology, Mailman School of Public Health, Columbia University
- Region served: United States
- Official language: English
- Editor in Chief: Dr. Dana March
- Parent organization: Department of Epidemiology at the Mailman School of Public Health
- Affiliations: Columbia University
- Staff: 12
- Website: the2x2project.org

The 2x2 Project is a collaboration of epidemiologists, health science communicators and writers that publishes public health news and analysis. The project is sponsored by the Columbia University's Department of Epidemiology at the Mailman School of Public Health.

== Background ==
The 2x2 Project went live on September 10, 2012, using the slogan, "Health Beyond the Headlines." The principle behind the 2x2 project's creation is that public health information should be accessible to everyone, not just researchers who read scientific literature. Its goal is to share health news and information in clear, compelling language that engages the public.

Contributors and fellows write stories discussing issues varying from AIDS activism to brain trauma in professional football players. The project also publishes a weekly roundup of the "best and worst" health news from around the web, ranking reports on a scale from 'Fail' to 'FTW' (For the Win).

The Editor in Chief is Dana March, an assistant professor of epidemiology at Columbia's Mailman School of Public Health.

According to their website, the 2x2 Project wants to bring epidemiology, the science of public health focused on the promotion of population health through disease prevention, out of the ivory tower: "Our goal through the 2×2 Project is to engage a broader audience—including thought leaders and policy makers from outside the discipline—who can help translate scientific findings into practice."

== Media ==
One of the website's editors, social epidemiologist Abdul El-Sayed, received media attention from ABC News Radio when he wrote an open letter to NBA player LeBron James saying his promotion of Coca-Cola and McDonald's in commercials that were targeted largely toward his young fans was contributing to the problem of childhood obesity. El-Sayed calculated that James was responsible for selling more than a billion spoons of sugar and illustrated his point using a digitally altered image of the athlete as an obese man. "What if LeBron James drank all of the Sprite (soft drink) he wants our kids to drink?" the caption read. El-Sayed also told ABC news at the time that Beyoncé should reconsider her deal to become a spokesperson for Pepsi.

The 2x2 Project also contributes regularly to other online media, including Huffington Post, Sense and Sustainability, a website on sustainable development, and other non-profit and online media.

A weekly feature of the project includes a series on the relationship of pop culture and public health. Through a crowd sourced selection of music, the 2x2 project examines the impact of both intentional and unintentional public health messaging found in our favourite pop songs.

== Fellowships ==
The 2x2 Project offers fellowships to students interested in hands-on communication of health information. The annual Communication in Health and Epidemiology Fellowship (CHEF) provides education in both theory and practice through formal training in health communication in the form of didactic lectures, workshops, and networking events along with formal work experience.

== See also ==
- Department of Epidemiology, Columbia University
