= Fast oil recovery =

Fast oil recovery (FOR) is a technology in the maritime industry designed to facilitate efficient and safe removal of oil spills in emergency situations. It can be integrated into new or existing vessels to enhance spill response capabilities.

Oil spills pose significant risks to the environment, public health, marine life, and local economies. The severe consequences of oil spills, particularly damages to marine ecosystems, have increased the demand for ships better equipped to respond to potential oil accidents. Millions of vessels operate in North American waters, and a portion of them contribute to oil pollution. The Fast Oil Recovery system allows for the rapid removal of oil and liquid noxious substances from spills.

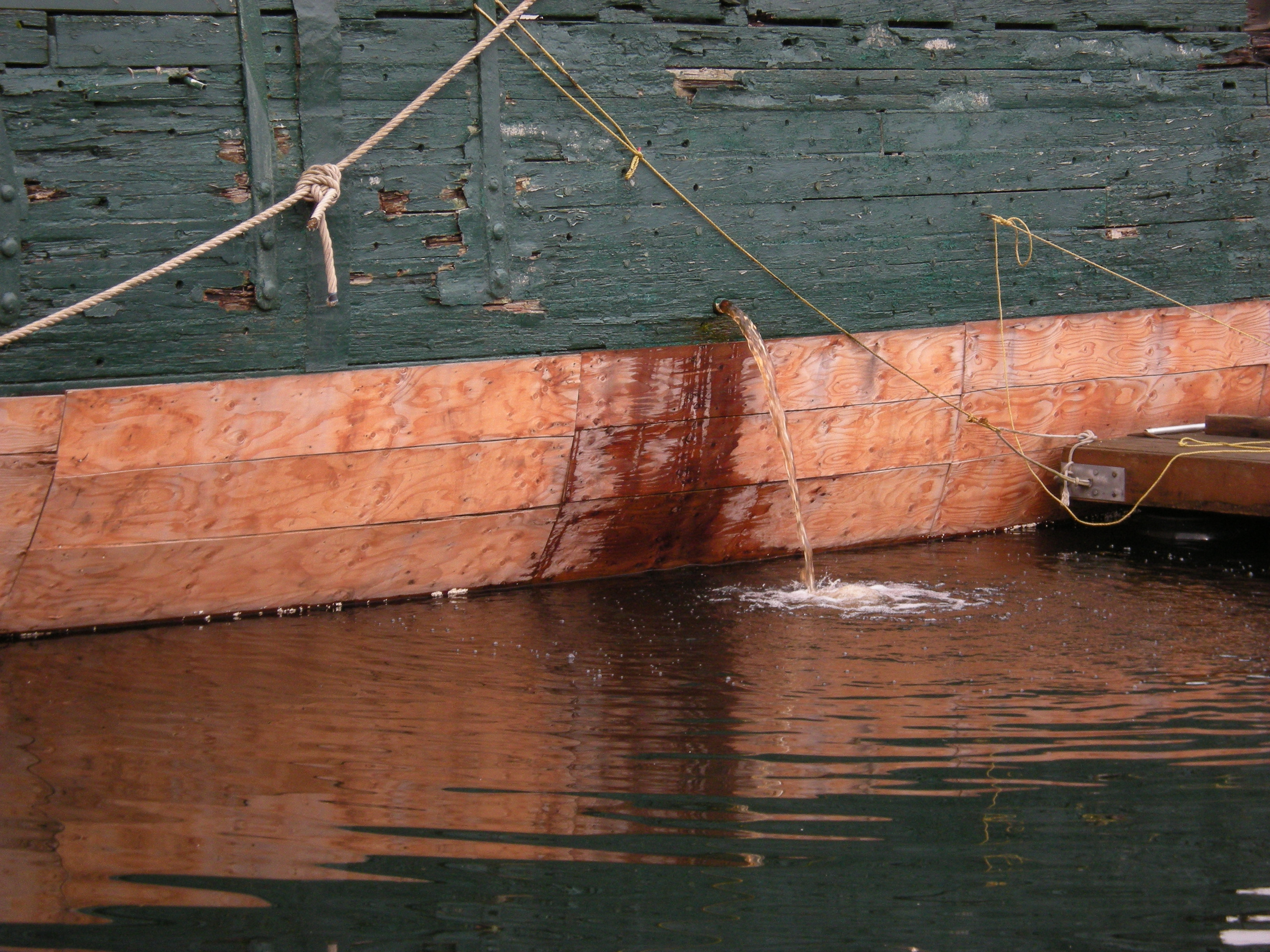
Bilge water being pumped out of a ship.

Some ships have installed fast oil recovery systems (FORS) to minimize oil contamination in bilge water. These systems are designed to remove up to 99.9% of the oil from a vessel's bilge, reducing reliance on traditional absorbent pads and filters, which require frequent maintenance and replacement.

To address these challenges, companies like JLMD and Blue Water have developed oil recovery systems to mitigate the environmental risks associated with oil spills.

Research has shown that during wreckages, groundings, and other crisis situations, the oil trapped within the ship requires complex procedures and specialized technologies for recovery. Ship owners, shipping authorities, salvage companies, and other stakeholders can experience difficulties accessing the tanks to remove the remaining pollutants on board. These challenges highlight the weaknesses of current response procedures and the need for better onboard equipment to facilitate oil recovery.
