= Rabiabad, South Khorasan =

Rabiabad ربيع اباد
- Village
- Location within Iran
- Coordinates: 32°52′08″N 59°48′58″E
- Country: Iran
- Province: South Khorasan
- County: Darmian
- Bakhsh: Central
- Rural District: Darmian

Population (2006)
  - Total: 83
- Time zone: UTC+3:30 (IRST)
  - Summer (DST): UTC+4:30 (IRDT)

Rabiabad (Persian: ربيع اباد, also Romanized as Rabī‘ābād; also known as Rabī‘ābād-e Tūtān, Tūtau, and Tūtū) is a village in Darmian Rural District, in the Central District of Darmian County, South Khorasan Province, Iran. At the 2006 census, its population was 83, in 17 families.
