= Forced outage =

In electrical engineering, forced outage is the shutdown condition of a power station, transmission line or distribution line when the generating unit is unavailable to produce power due to unexpected breakdown.

Forced outage can be caused by equipment failures, disruption in the power plant fuel supply chain, operator error etc.

== Forced outage rate ==
Forced outage rate (FOR or FOAR) of a power station unit is the probability that the unit will not be available for service when required.

FOR is defined as the number of hours the unit is on forced outage over the total number of hours in a year (which is the sum of hours the power station is available for service and hours the power station is in forced outage).

Two derivative metrics are also used:

- equivalent forced outage rate (EFOR, also equipment EFOR, EEFOR) has a different denominator: instead of the total number of hours in the year, only the hours when the unit was needed for load are counted.
- weighted EFOR (WEFOR) is EFOR weighted by the capacity of the unit.

== See also ==
- Power station
