= AN/USQ-17 =

UNIVAC military computer

The AN/USQ-17 or Naval Tactical Data System (NTDS) computer referred to in Sperry Rand documents as the Univac M-460, was Seymour Cray's last design for UNIVAC. UNIVAC later released a commercial version, the UNIVAC 490. That system was later upgraded to a multiprocessor configuration as the 494.

In accordance with the Joint Electronics Type Designation System (JETDS), the "AN/USQ-17" designation represents the 17th design of an Army-Navy electronic device for general utility special combination equipment. The JETDS system also now is used to name all Department of Defense electronic systems.

== Overview ==
The machine was the size and shape of a refrigerator, about four feet high (roughly 1.20 meters), with a hinged lid for access. Shortly after completing the prototype design, Cray left to join Control Data Corporation. When the Navy awarded Sperry Rand a US$50 million contract to build the AN/USQ-17, Univac engineers redesigned the entire machine from scratch using silicon transistors. They retained the instruction set, so that programs developed for the original machine would still run on the new one.

As part of the redesign it was decided to improve access, and the second version was designed to stand upright, like an old fashioned double-door refrigerator, about six feet tall (roughly 1.80 m). This new design was designated the AN/USQ-20.

Instructions were represented as 30-bit words, in the following format:

  f   6 bits   function code 
  j   3 bits   jump condition designator 
  k   3 bits   partial word designator 
  b   3 bits   which index register to use 
  y  15 bits   operand address in memory

Numbers were represented as 30-bit words, this allowed for five 6-bit alphanumeric characters per word.

The main memory was 32,768 = 32K words of core memory.

The available processor registers were:

- One 30-bit accumulator (A).
- One 30-bit Q register (combined with A to give a total of 60 bits for the result of multiplication or the dividend in division).
- Seven 15-bit index registers (B1–B7).

The instruction format defined for the AN/USQ-17 marked the beginning of an instruction set which would be carried on, with many changes along the way, into later UNIVAC computers including the UNIVAC 1100/2200 series, which is still in use today.

== First delivery of NTDS and related U.S. Navy computers ==
- AN/USQ17, 30 bit, March 1958
- CP-642 AKA AN/USQ-20, 30 bit, 1960
- AN/UYK-8, 30 bit, 1967
- AN/UYK-7, 32 bit, 1971
- AN/UYK-43, 32 bit, 1984
- AN/UYK-20, 16 bit, 1973
- AN/AYK-14, 16 bit, 1980
- AN/UYK-44, 16 bit, 1984

== See also ==
- List of military electronics of the United States
- List of UNIVAC products
- History of computing hardware
