= NTDS =

NTDS can refer to:

- Naval Tactical Data System
- Neglected tropical diseases
- Neural tube defects
- NT Directory Service
