= UNIVAC 490 =

Computer designed in the early 1960s

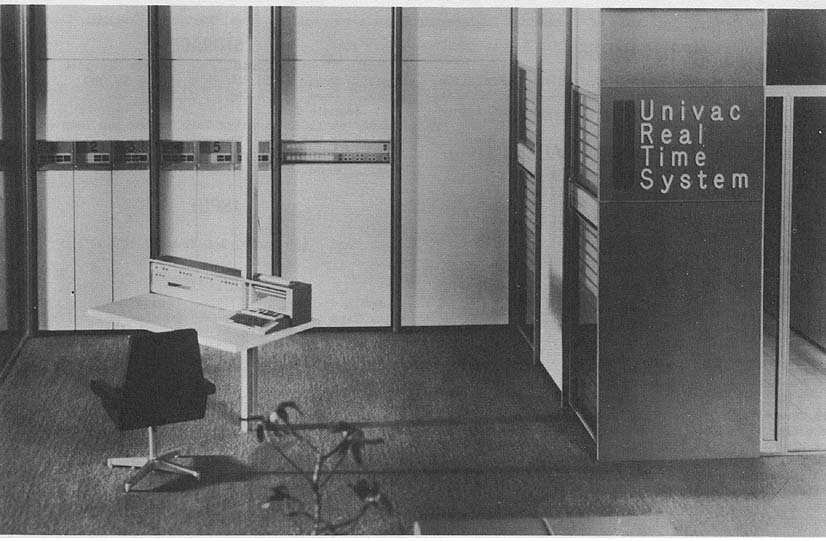
A UNIVAC 490 at the Ballistic Research Laboratories, Maryland, US

The UNIVAC 490 was a UNIVAC computer with 16K or 32K words of magnetic-core memory. The words had 30 bits and the cycle time was 4.8 microseconds. It was a commercial derivative of the instruction set that had been developed for the AN/USQ-17 by Seymour Cray for the United States Navy. This was the last machine that Cray designed before leaving UNIVAC to join the early Control Data Corporation.

Univac Federal Systems would further develop this system into the AN/USQ-20 for the US Navy. That system was the heart of the Naval Tactical Data System which pioneered the use of shipboard computers for air defense. The military version went by a variety of names: UNIVAC 1232, AN/USQ-20, MIL-1206 and CP642.

== Overview ==
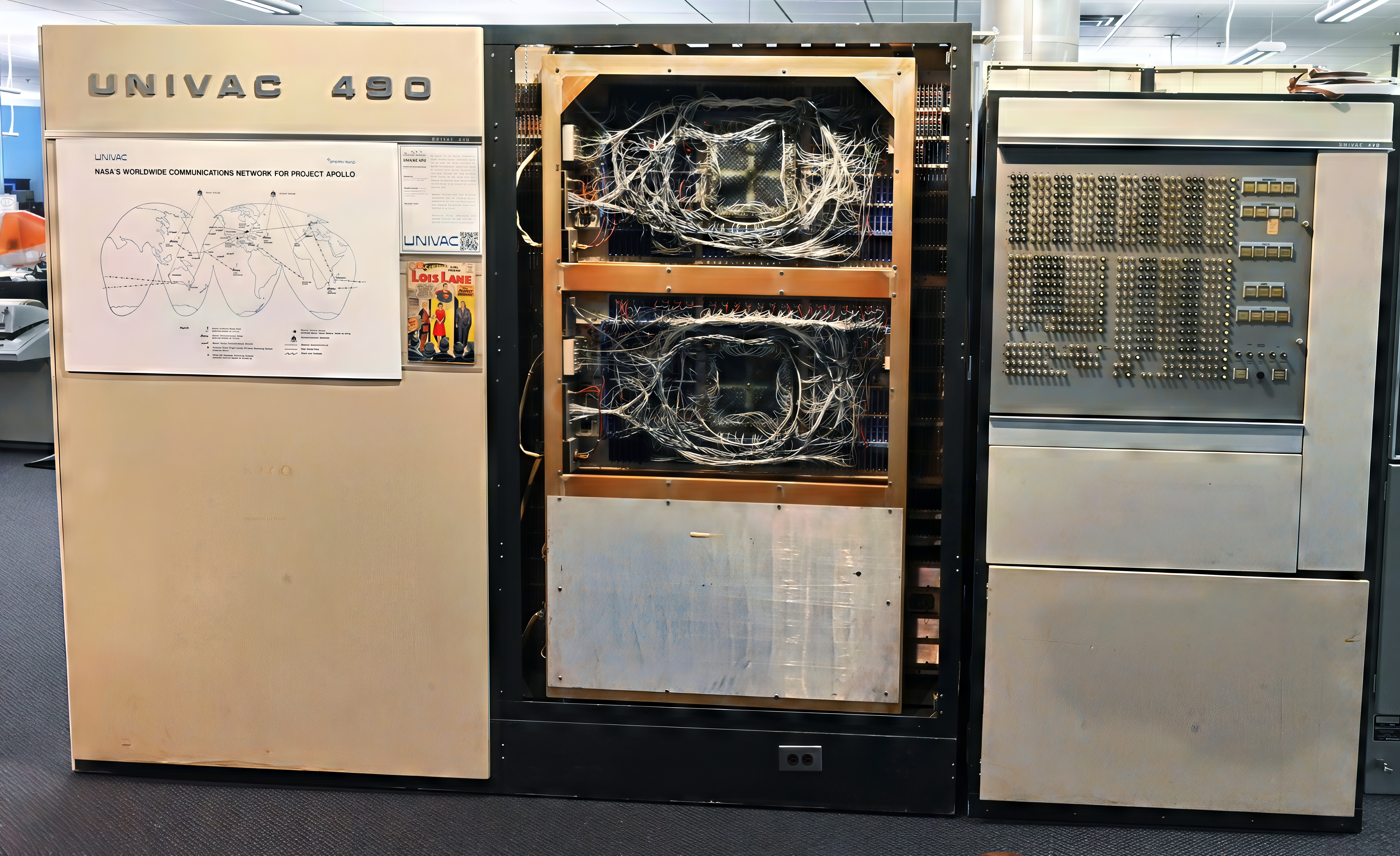
UNIVAC 490 at System Source Computer Museum (upgraded to a 494)

At least 47 of these machines were made (serial numbers run from 101 to 147). Six were installed at NASA and played important roles in Gemini and the Apollo missions. The U490 had complete control of most or all of the data readout screens in Houston Mission Control. The USAF had two installed, as did Lockheed.

Airlines using the 490 Real-Time system included Eastern and Northwest Orient – principally airline reservations systems at Eastern Air Lines (1963) and British European Airways (BEACON – 1964). Other commercial installations of the 490 Real-Time included two at Westinghouse, two at Hammermill Paper Company, and one each at Alcoa, U.S. Steel, Bethlehem Steel and General Motors.

The only surviving, nearly complete, original, civilian version of the 490 Real Time System is on display at the System Source Computer Museum in Hunt Valley, Maryland. It has six banks of memory cores. System Source also has a nearly complete set of original documentation for the machine, including original blueprints and troubleshooting data. This includes the Boss and Wilen troubleshooting document.

The standard operating system was REX (RealTime Exec), except at Eastern and B.E.A. where a custom operating system was developed for airline reservations (CONTORTS – CONTrol Of Real Time System). CONTORTS was the origin of Univac's subsequent RT operating systems for 494 (STARS) and later converted to the 1100 Series (RTOS).

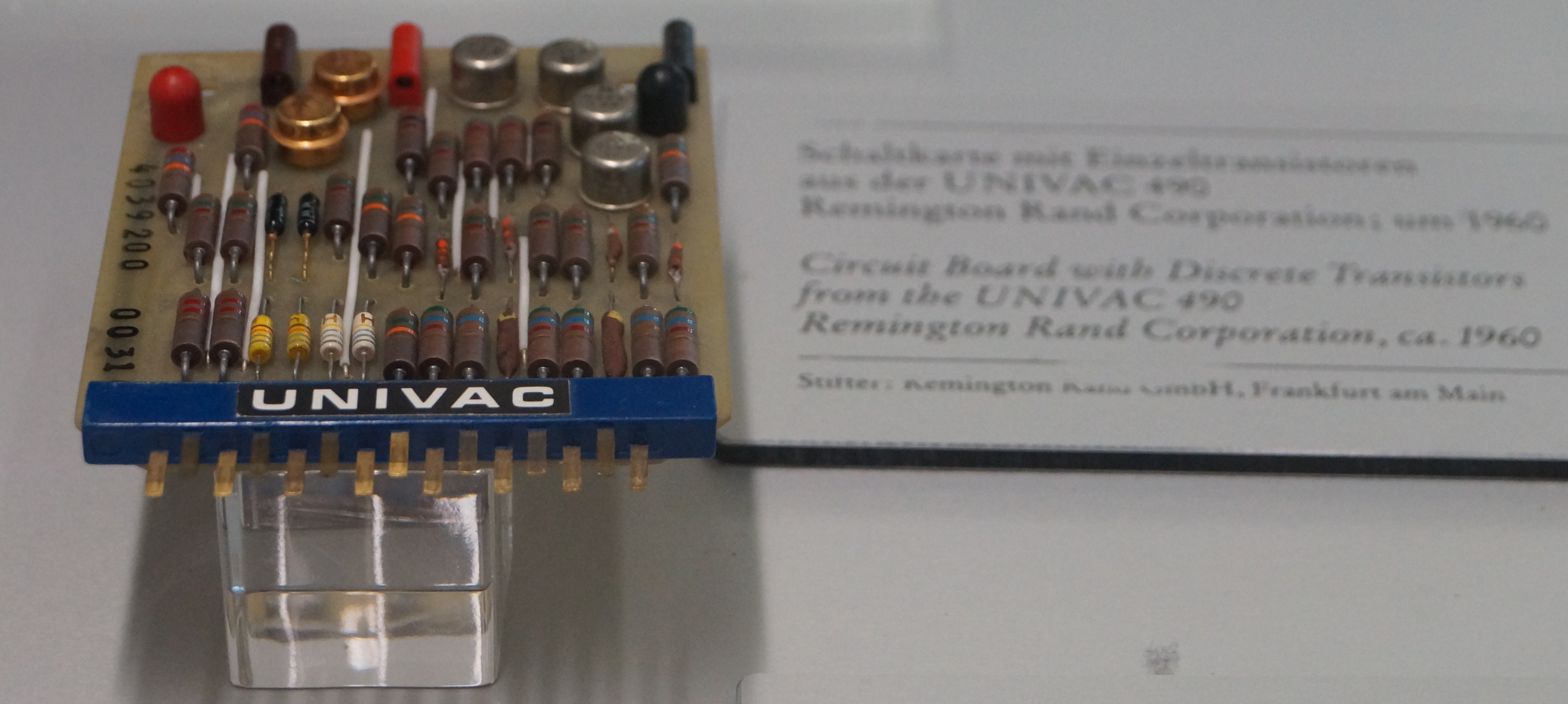
A circuit board from the UNIVAC 490 computer on display at the Deutsches Museum

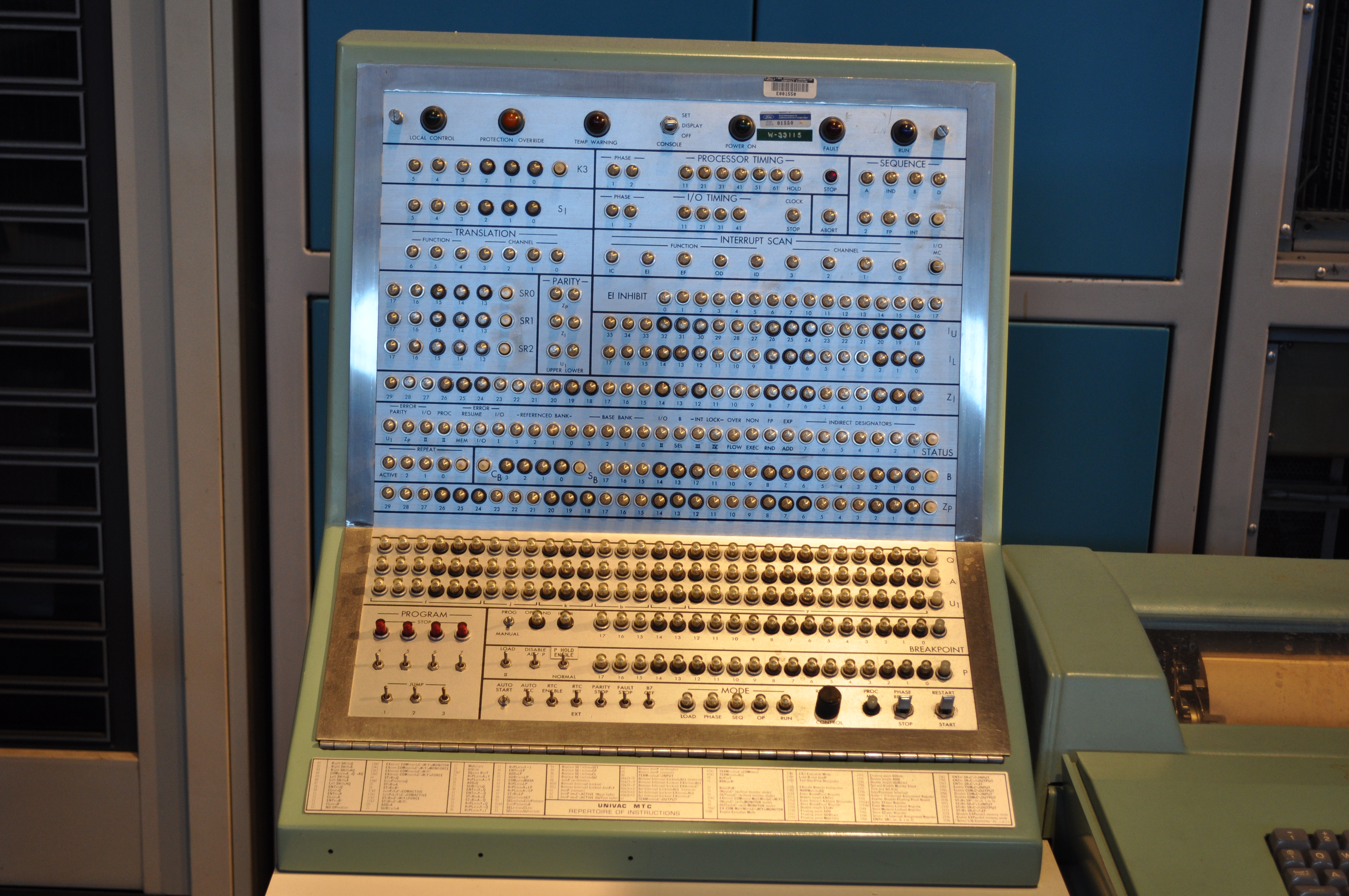
The Univac 1232 was a military version of the UNIVAC 490.

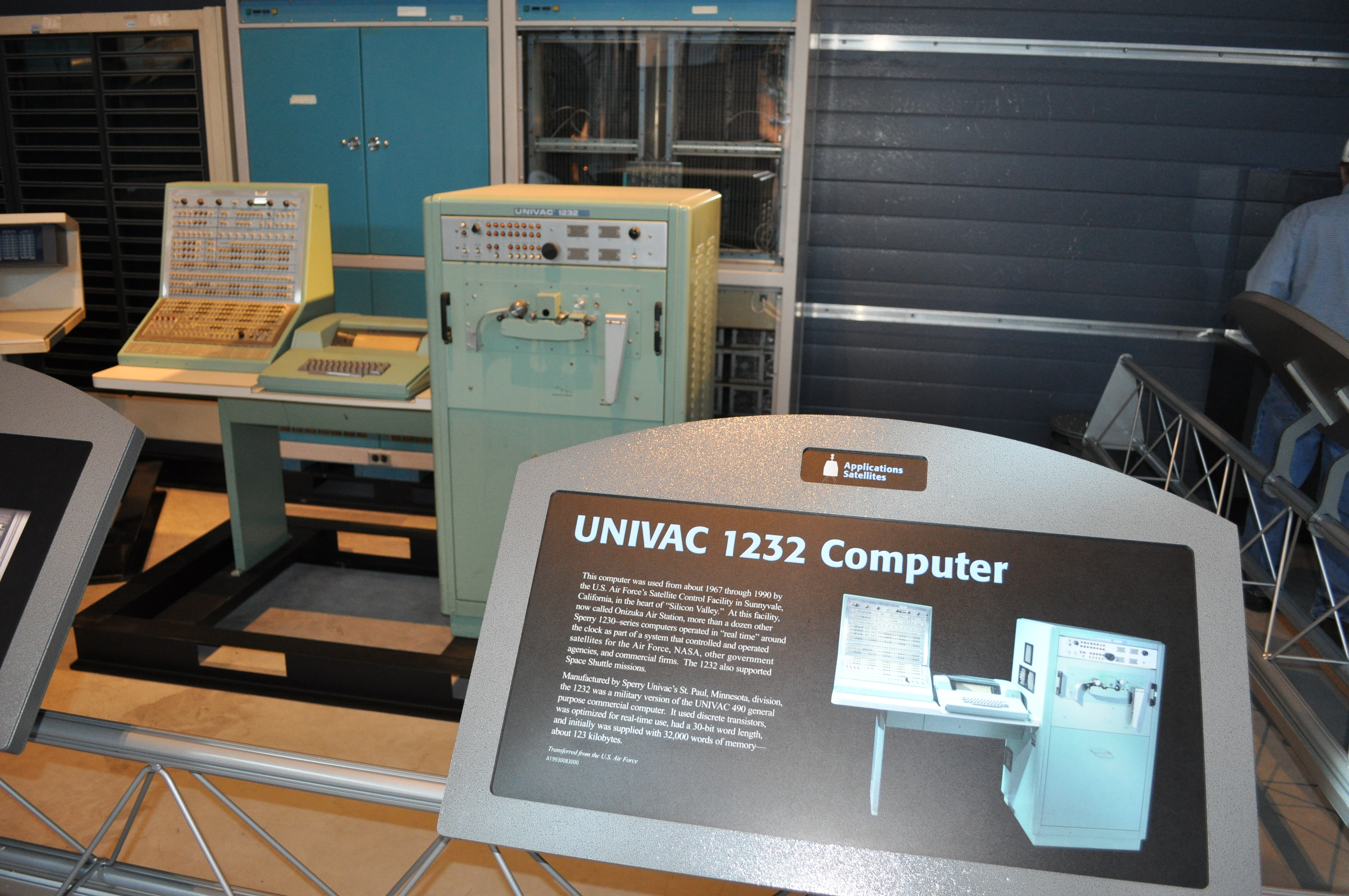
A Univac 1232 at the Smithsonian National Air and Space Museum

== Architecture ==
The instruction word format:

- f – Function code designator (6 bits)
- j – Branch condition designator (3 bits)
- k – Operand-interpretation designator (3 bits)
- b – Operand address modification designator (3 bits)
- y – Operand designator (15 bits)

Numbers were represented in ones' complement.

The machine provided the programmer with the following registers:

- Seven B-registers (Address modifying index registers) 15 bits each
- One A-register or accumulator 30 bits
- One Q-register and auxiliary arithmetic register 30 bits

== Hardware ==
The arithmetic unit used 13,819 transistors of various types and 37,543 diodes of various types.

== Successor systems ==
In June 1965, UNIVAC launched a family of successor systems known as the UNIVAC 490 Modular Real Time Systems. This consisted of the UNIVAC 491, 492 and 494. The 494 was heavily used by NASA as part of the communications complex for the Apollo Mission. Other users include BEA, Iberia Airlines, Scandinavian Airlines and Lufthansa.

Subsequently as UNIVAC decided to focus on the UNIVAC 1100/2200 series an option to run the 1110/80 in 494 mode was added. This emulator was implemented using microcode.

== See also ==
- AN/USQ-17
- List of UNIVAC products
- History of computing hardware
