= USS Kinkaid =

Spruance-class destroyer

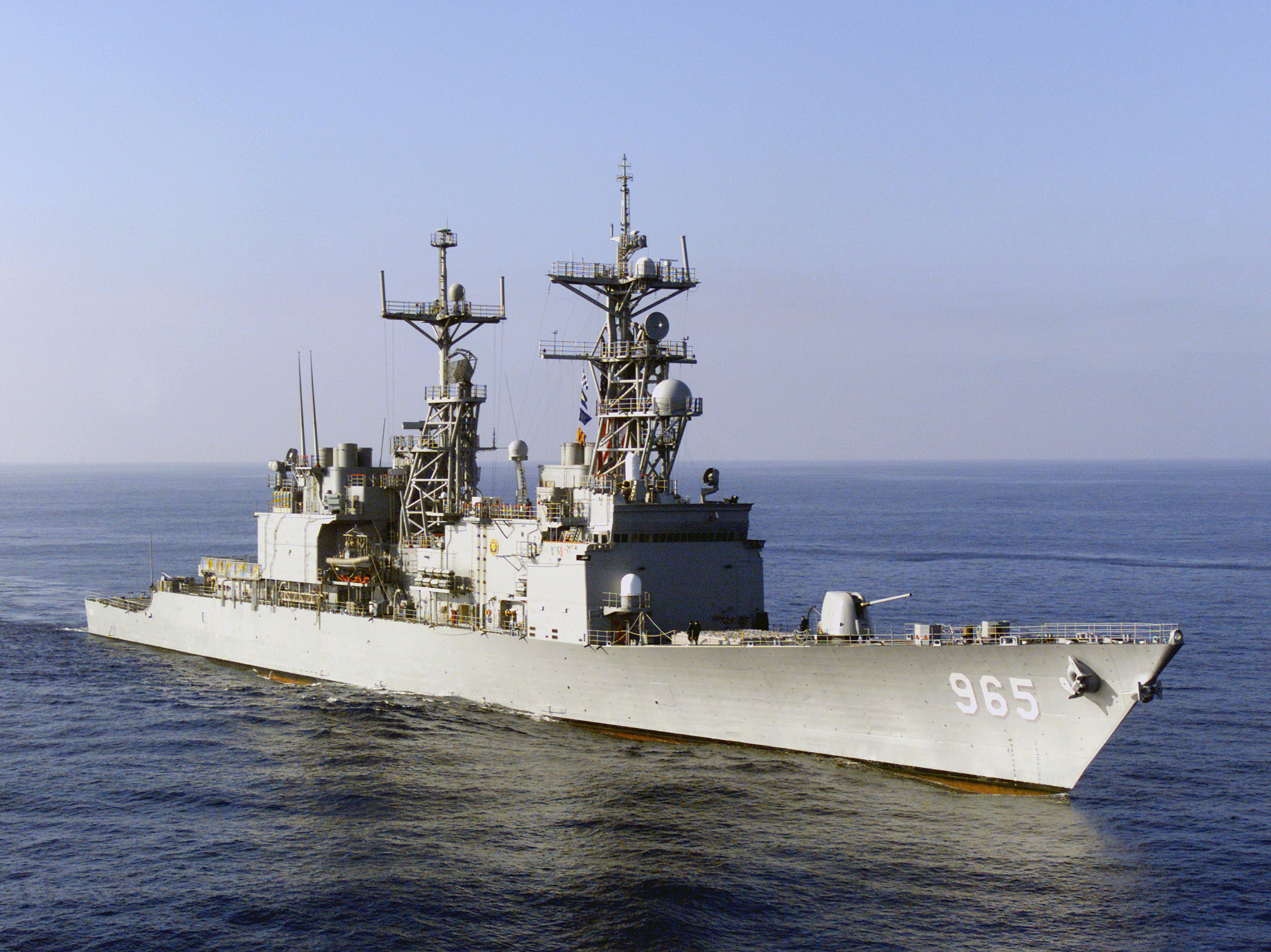
- USS Kinkaid on 17 June 2002

History

United States
- Name: Kinkaid
- Namesake: Thomas C. Kinkaid
- Ordered: 1 June 1970
- Builder: Ingalls Shipbuilding
- Laid down: 19 April 1973
- Launched: 25 May 1974
- Acquired: 1 June 1976
- Commissioned: 10 July 1976
- Decommissioned: 7 January 2003
- Stricken: 6 April 2004
- Identification: Callsign: NJPG; Hull number: DDG-965
- Motto: Steadfast and True
- Nickname(s): Kinky-D
- Fate: Sunk as target, 14 July 2004
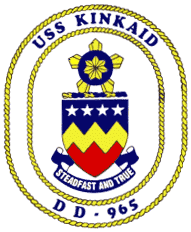
- Badge

General characteristics
- Class & type: Spruance-class destroyer
- Displacement: 8,040 long tons (8,170 t) full load
- Length: 529 ft (161 m) waterline; 563 ft (172 m) overall
- Beam: 55 ft (17 m)
- Draft: 29 ft (8.8 m)
- Installed power: 3 × 501-K17 generator sets (2,000 kW (2,700 hp) each)
- Propulsion: 4 × General Electric LM2500 gas turbines, 2 shafts, 80,000 shp (60 MW)
- Speed: 32.5 knots (60.2 km/h; 37.4 mph)
- Range: 6,000 nmi (11,000 km; 6,900 mi) at 20 knots (37 km/h; 23 mph)
- Complement: 19 officers, 315 enlisted
- Sensors & processing systems: AN/SPS-40 air search radar; AN/SPG-60 fire control radar; AN/SPS-55 surface search radar; AN/SPQ-9 gun fire control radar; Mark 23 TAS automatic detection and tracking radar; AN/SPS-65 missile fire control radar; AN/SQS-53 bow-mounted active sonar; AN/SQR-19 TACTAS towed array passive sonar; Naval Tactical Data System
- Electronic warfare & decoys: AN/SLQ-32 electronic warfare system; AN/SLQ-25 Nixie torpedo countermeasures; Mark 36 SRBOC decoy launching system; AN/SLQ-49 inflatable decoys
- Armament: 2 × 5 in (127 mm) 54 caliber Mark 45 dual purpose guns; 2 × 20 mm Phalanx CIWS Mark 15 guns; 1 × 8 cell ASROC launcher (removed); 1 × 8 cell NATO Sea Sparrow Mark 29 missile launcher; 2 × quadruple Harpoon missile canisters; 2 × Mark 32 triple 12.75 in (324 mm) torpedo tubes (Mk 46 torpedoes); 1 × 61 cell Mk 41 VLS launcher for Tomahawk missiles
- Aircraft carried: 2 × Sikorsky SH-60 Seahawk LAMPS III helicopters
- Aviation facilities: Flight deck and enclosed hangar for up to two medium-lift helicopters

USS Kinkaid (DD-965), named for Admiral Thomas C. Kinkaid USN (1888–1972), was a Spruance-class destroyer built by the Ingalls Shipbuilding Division of Litton Industries at Pascagoula, Mississippi. Launched in 1974, she was decommissioned in 2003 and sunk in 2004. She was the third "Spru-can" to be built.

== History ==
Between the late evening of 22 February and the early morning of 23 February 1979, 25 construction workers from Texas, constructing a naval base in the port of Char Bahar, were evacuated in the early morning hours by Kinkaid, and they were brought to the small island of Bahrain. This became known as the "Gulf of Aden/Yemen Indian Ocean Contingency Operation of 12/8/78 – 6/6/79". The crew of Kinkaid were awarded the Navy Expeditionary Medal and the Armed Forces Humanitarian Service Medal.

Kinkaid served as the American trials ship for the jointly United States Navy and Royal Canadian Navy developed AN/SAR-8 Infrared Search and Target Designation System, having the Advanced Development Model installed in September 1979 for sea trials.

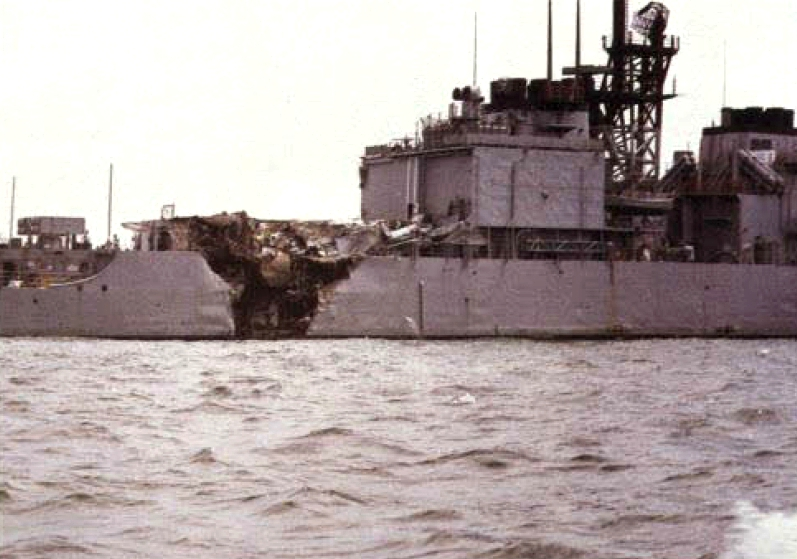
Kinkaid after her collision with MV Kota Petani, 12 November 1989

In November 1989, Kinkaid and the Panamanian-registered freighter MV Kota Petani were involved in a collision in the Strait of Malacca. The collision caused one death and 15 other casualties to the Kinkaid's crew, and US$15 million in damages to Kinkaid. She made Singapore under her own power for temporary repairs, then Subic Bay, Philippines, then San Diego for permanent repairs.

Kinkaid again reprised her role as the trials vessel for AN/SAR-8 in 1990, having a new, more capable manufacturing prototype unit installed that December for trials which lasted until mid-1991.

On 4 July 1993, Kinkaid paid a three-day port visit to Acajutla, marking the first visit by a United States warship to El Salvador in more than a dozen years. Kinkaid was then assigned to Destroyer Squadron 13 in San Diego and was, at the time, conducting two months of routine operations under the operational command of Joint Task Force Four, located in Key West, Florida. Kinkaid returned to San Diego in mid-August 1993.

Kinkaid deployed on 10 November 1994, as part of the Constellation carrier battle group for a six-month deployment to the western Pacific, Indian Ocean and Persian Gulf. She spent most of December in the Western Pacific. With the Constellation carrier battle group, she entered the Persian Gulf, on 11 January 1995, and departed it on 23 March. The Constellation carrier battle group conducted several exercises during the deployment, including Beachcrest 95, a routine annual exercise that included air combat, air control and air-to-ground combat support training in designated areas on Okinawa and Ie Shima; Nautical Swimmer 95-2 and Nautical Artist 95–2, naval air and surface exercises intended to improve interoperability between forces of the United States and friendly Persian Gulf nations; Beacon Flash 95–1, a combined naval tactical air exercise to improve readiness with friendly Persian Gulf nations; Eager Archer 95–1, an air training exercise between units of CVW 2 and Kuwait that provided dissimilar air combat training, formal joint strike training and in-flight refueling training for the Kuwaiti air force; and Sharem 110, a United States anti-submarine warfare (ASW) training exercise in the Gulf of Oman involving several battle group units. The battle group also conducted exercises with units of the Royal Australian Navy off the coast of western Australia. Kinkaid made its seventh deployment and supported the battle group by performing the anti-submarine warfare mission.

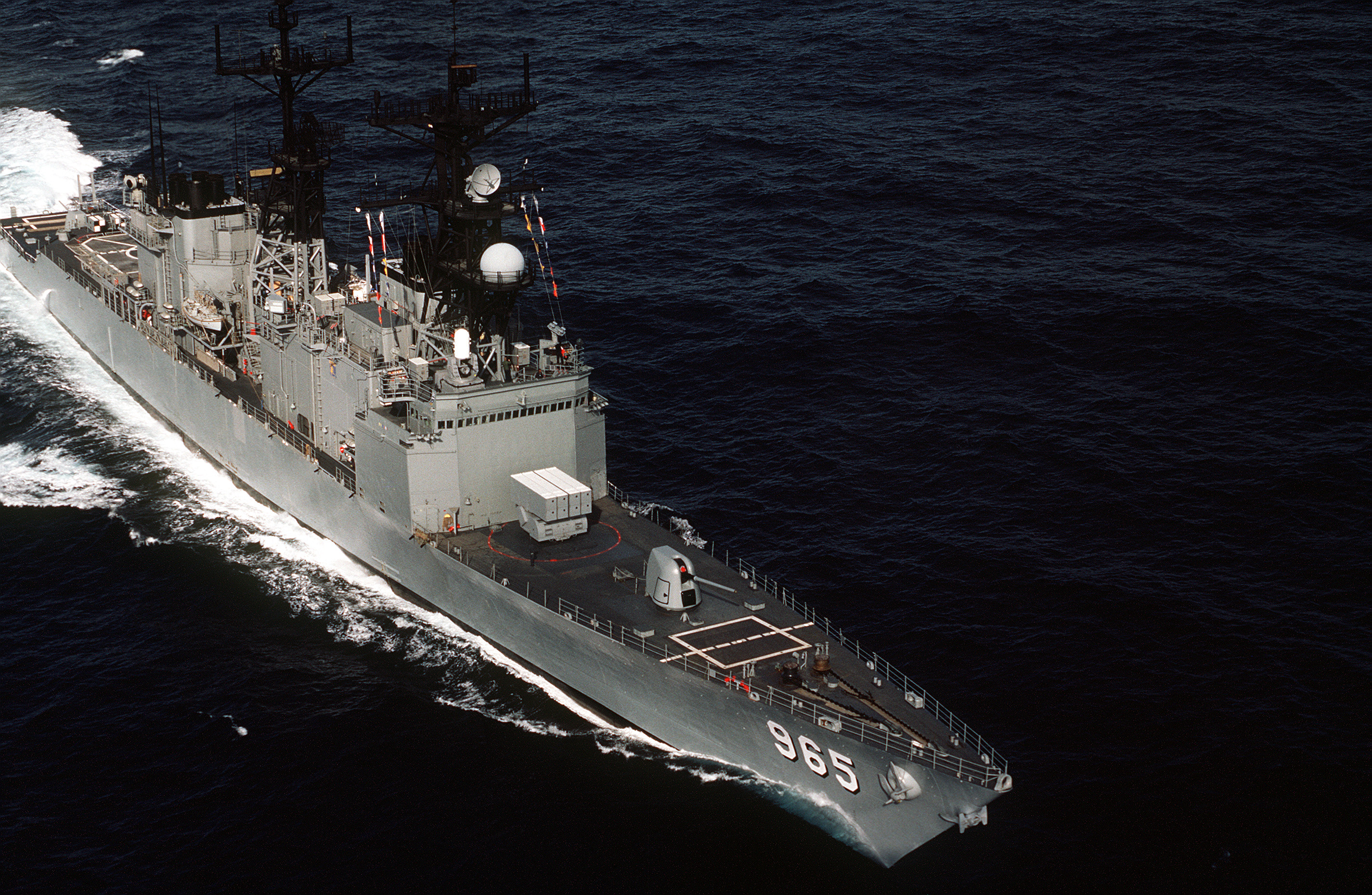
Kinkaid in the early 1980s, with black masts and ASROC launcher.

Kinkaid underwent a period of overhaul in June 1995. As a result of a reorganization of the Pacific Fleet's surface ships into six core battle groups and eight destroyer squadrons, Kinkaid was reassigned to Destroyer Squadron 21. The reorganization was scheduled to have been completed by 1 October 1995, with homeport changes to be completed within the next year. On January 11, 1996, it deployed to the Persian Gulf. In mid-1997, as part of the Nimitz carrier battle group, Kinkaid took part in Pacific Joint Task Force Exercise 97-2 (JTFEX 97–2). The exercise was conducted off the coast of southern California and also included units from the Air Force, Army and Japan. Nimitz, from 20 July through 24 July, then conducted a warfighting demonstration called Surge Exercise (SURGEX), during which it demonstrated the firepower of the carrier/airwing team and its ability to sustain continuous operations in support of forces ashore in the initial four days of a conflict when a deployed carrier might be the only asset available to provide such support. During the exercise, Comstock, Kinkaid and Ford practiced maritime interception operations. Kinkaid also escorted the civilian merchant ship Viking Serenade through the simulated "war zone".

Kinkaid then deployed as part of the Nimitz carrier battle group. After Western Pacific visits in Yokosuka, Japan, and Hong Kong, a planned visit to Singapore was canceled when Iraq violated a United Nations imposed "no fly" zone. With Nimitz directed to proceed to the region immediately to reinforce Operation Southern Watch operations, Kinkaid arrived in the Persian Gulf on 12 October after transiting the Strait of Hormuz.

During Nimitz's deployment in the Persian Gulf, Kinkaid was accused by Iran of spying on its military exercises. Kinkaid was, however, in port in Bahrain at the purported time Iran claimed the spying was taking place.

Kinkaid returned on 28 February 1998, from a six-month Persian Gulf deployment. During the deployment Kinkaid served as Tomahawk ready strike platform, helped enforce the no-fly zone in Southern Iraq and conducted maritime interception operations.

Kinkaid was part of the Constellation carrier battle group, as Constellation officially relieved Theodore Roosevelt in the Persian Gulf in September 1999. The Constellation carrier battle group then spent the next 10 weeks in the Persian Gulf and conducted maritime interception operation boardings as well as flew combat air patrols over the Iraqi no-fly zones in support of Operation Southern Watch. During the period, Kinkaid rescued the merchant vessel Sima Star, a container ship, from sinking 70 miles (110 km) off the coast of Bahrain after taking on over 40 tons of water. Kinkaid sailors dewatered the fully loaded container ship, which was listing 15 degrees to the port side. After seven hours of battling poor ventilation and flooding below decks, Kinkaid's rescue and assistance team was able to return the Sima Star to a five-degree list, allowing its crew to sail into Bahrain the following Monday morning for repairs. Kinkaid returned home on 17 December 1999, after a six-months deployment. During its 10-week patrol in the Persian Gulf region, the Constellation carrier battle group flew more than 5,000 casualty-free sorties, including nearly 1,300 in support of Operation Southern Watch. These flights included nine separate combat strikes and more than 43 tons of ordnance expended on various Iraqi air defense sites in response to Iraqi aggression against coalition aircraft.

Kinkaid began, on 15 March 2001, a scheduled six-month 2001 Western Pacific (WestPac) deployment while attached to the Constellation carrier battle group (CVBG) and Boxer Amphibious Ready Group (ARG). The entire battle group had trained the previous six months in preparation for this deployment through a series of increasingly challenging exercises and operations. These pre-deployment exercises culminated in February 2001 with the successful completion of Joint Task Force Exercise 01–1. Over the following six months, battle group ships conducted multi-national and joint operations with the navies of various allied countries and visit ports in Western Pacific and Persian Gulf nations. The ships and squadrons were scheduled to return home in September.

== Sea swap ==
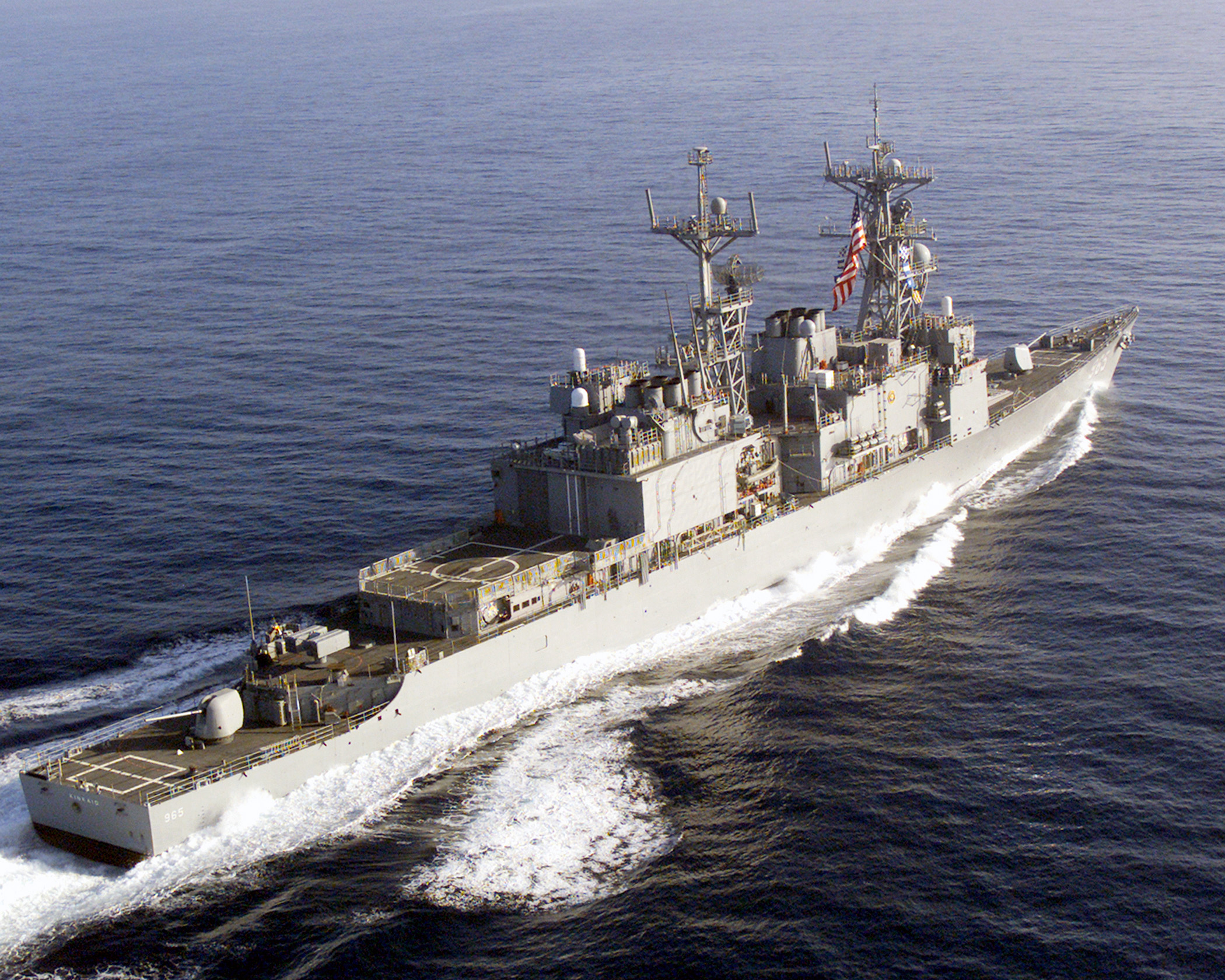
Aft view of Kinkaid, 2002.

The United States Navy Surface Force was scheduled to begin, in the summer of 2002, an initiative to test the effectiveness of deploying a single ship for 18-months while swapping out crews at six-month intervals. Called Sea Swap, this initial two-phased initiative would involve three Spruance-class destroyers (DDs)—Fletcher, Kinkaid and Oldendorf, and three Arleigh Burke-class destroyers (DDGs)—Higgins, John Paul Jones, and Benfold. For the DD phase, Fletcher and her crew would deploy with their battle group this summer, but after six months, only the crew would return. The ship would remain deployed and be crewed by sailors from Kinkaid. After completing their training cycle and decommissioning Kinkaid, these sailors would fly to a port in either Australia or Singapore to assume ownership of Fletcher and steam her back on-station. After six months, they would be replaced by the crew from Oldendorf who would have completed the same training and decommissioning schedule with their ship before flying out to relieve the Kinkaid crew. After four more months on station, the Oldendorf crew would then bring Fletcher back to the United States where it too would be decommissioned. Additionally, by executing this plan, the Navy would be able to eliminate the deployment of Paul F. Foster because the additional on-station time generated by swapping out the crews meant a ship would already be in theater meeting that requirement.

== Gallery ==
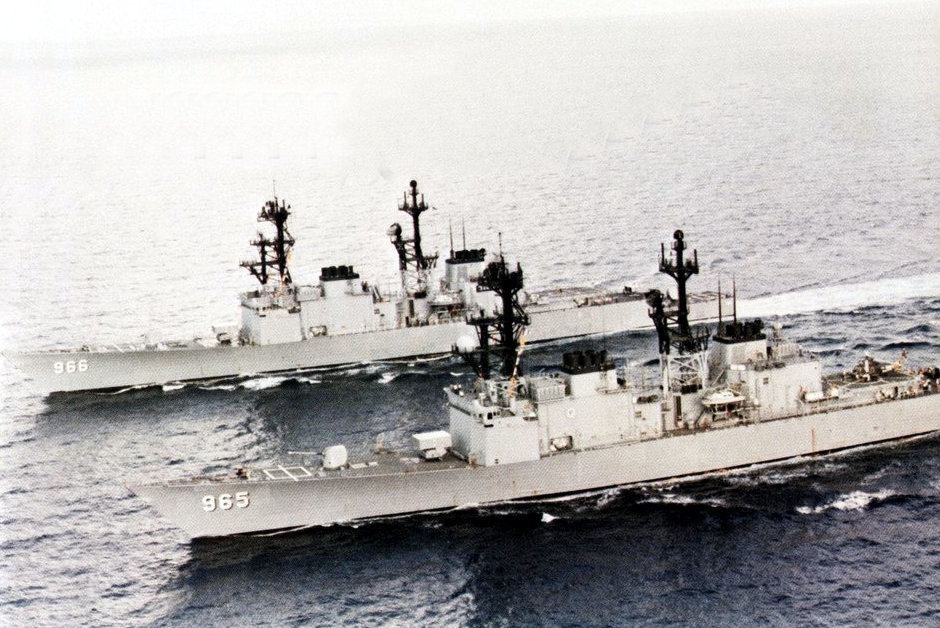
USS Kinkaid and USS Hewitt in 1978

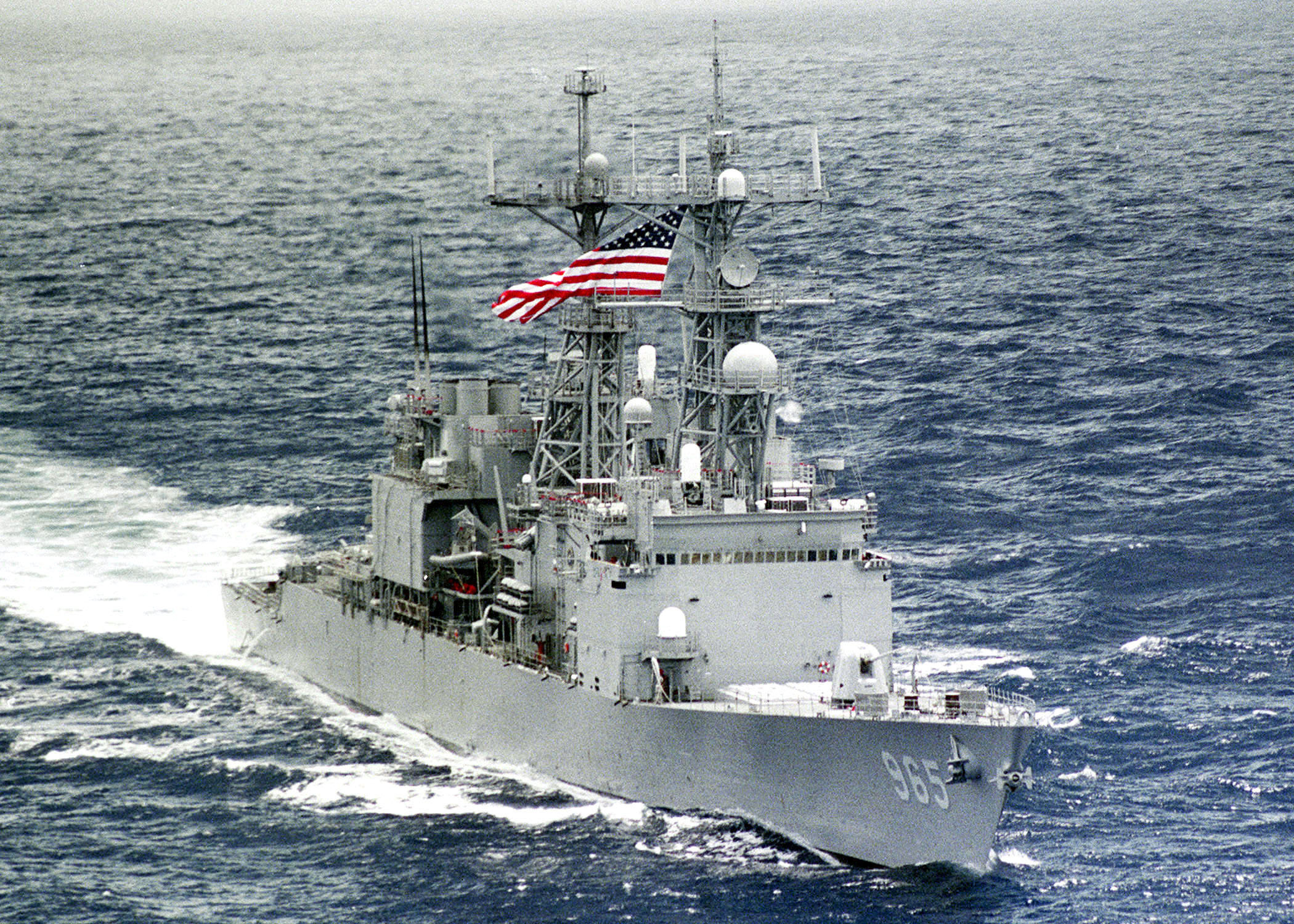
USS Kinkaid on 28 March 2001

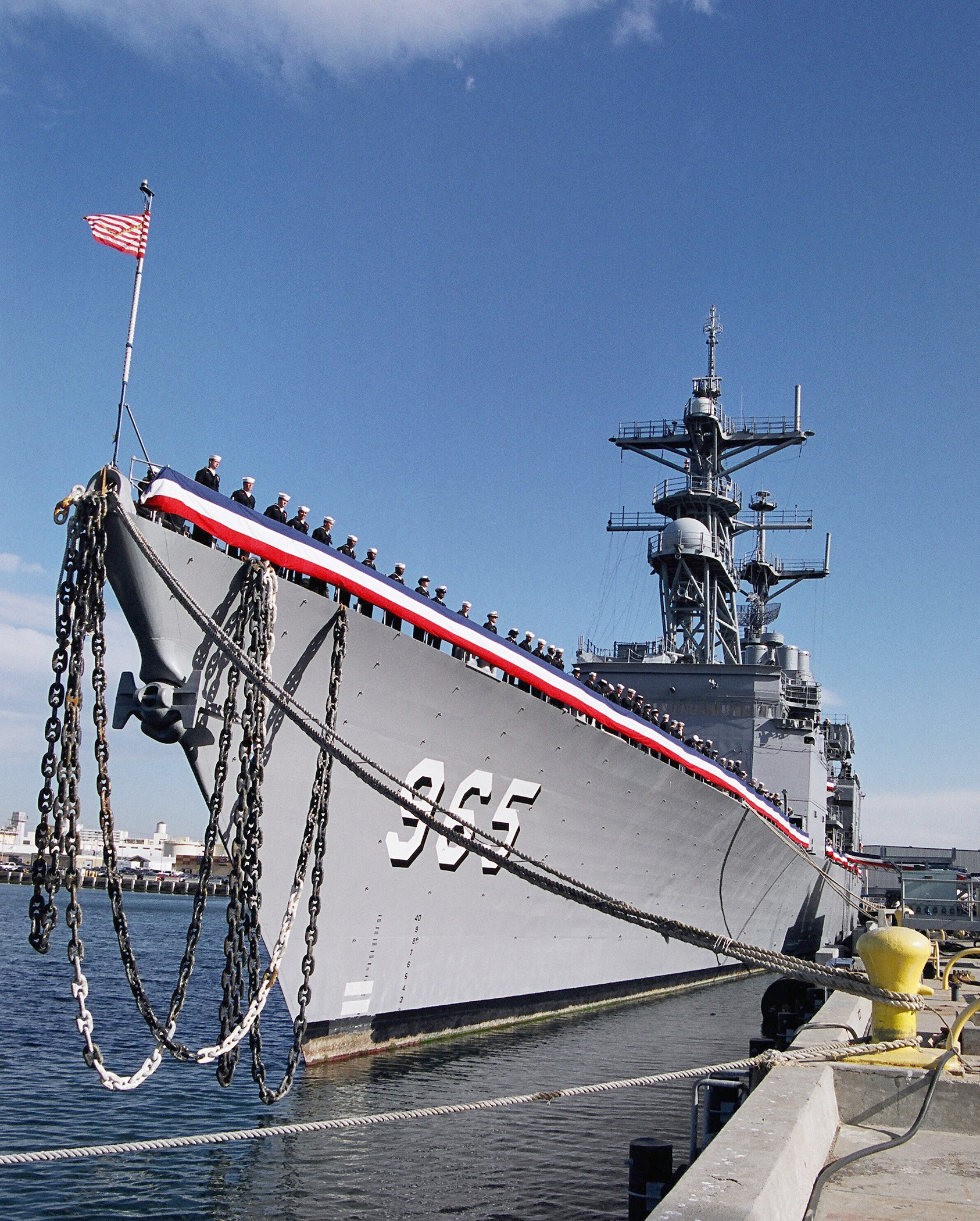
USS Kinkaid's decommissioning ceremony on 7 January 2003

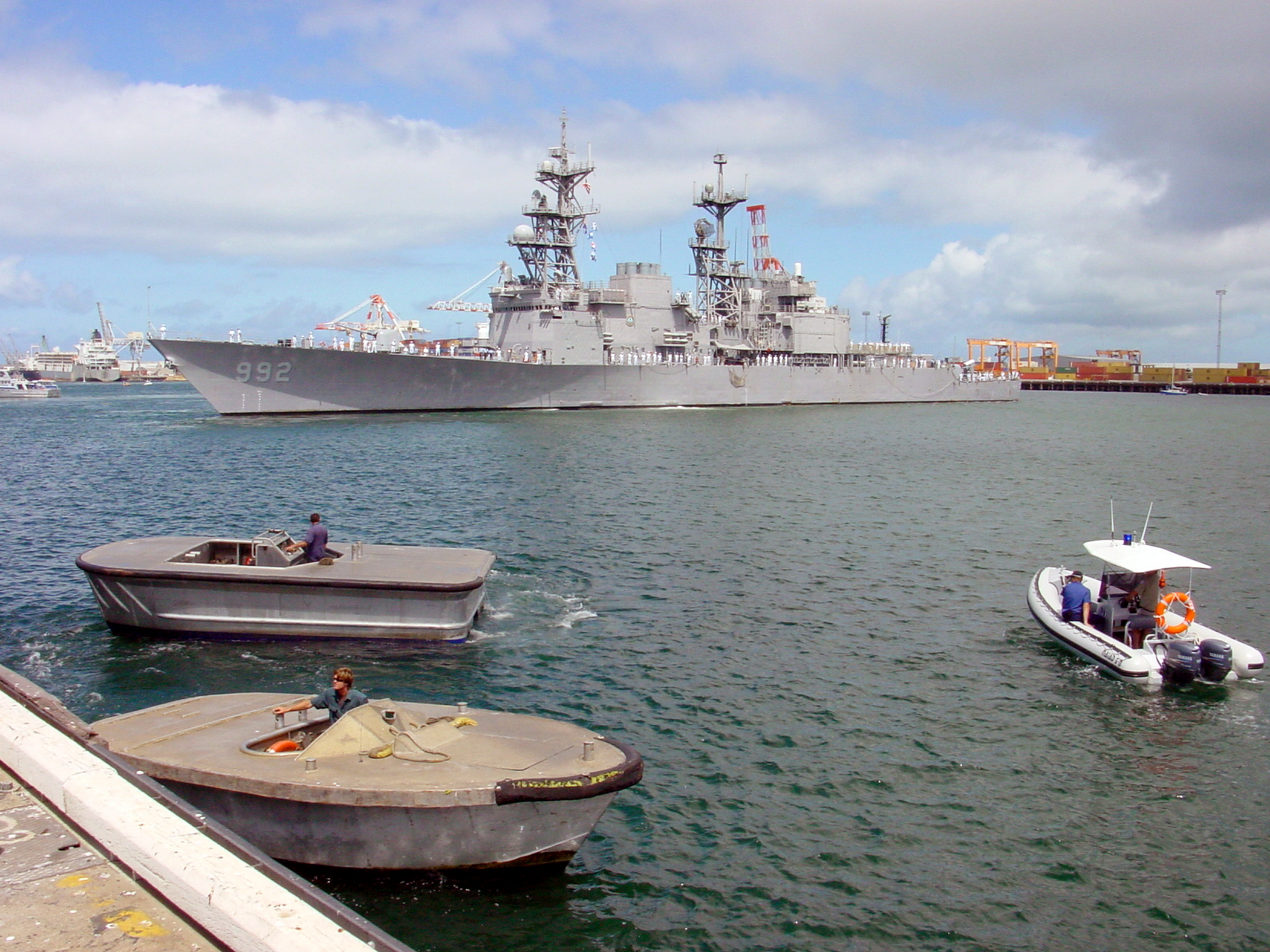
USS Kinkaid in Fremantle on 19 January 2003

== Awards ==
- Navy Unit Commendation – (Oct 1997-Apr 1998)
- Navy Meritorious Unit Commendation – (Sep 1985-Dec 1986, Jan 1999-Sep 2001)

== Fate ==
Kinkaid was decommissioned 7 January 2003 and placed at Pearl Harbor NISMF. Kinkaid was stricken 6 April 2004 and sunk during RIMPAC 2004 exercise as a target 14 July 2004 in the Pacific Ocean at 22°55′13.5″N 159°59′40.5″W in 2,548 fathoms (15,288 feet; 4,660 meters) of water.
