= AN/SAR-8 Infrared Search and Target Designation System =

Cold War military defence system

The AN/SAR-8 Infrared Search and Target Designation System (IRSTD System) was an infrared search and track (IRST) system developed by Spar Aerospace, General Electric Aerospace, Computing Devices Canada, and Scientific Atlanta for the United States Navy and Royal Canadian Navy during the Cold War. It was intended for use aboard Halifax-class frigates and Arleigh Burke-class destroyers along with other ships operated by both nations. The IRSTD System was to provide increased anti-ship missile defense capabilities to warships by detecting sea skimming anti-ship missiles that could not be tracked with radar due to their very small radar signatures. The AN/SAR-8 was designed to interface with both the Improved Basic Point Defense Missile System and Aegis Combat System. It was never fielded, with only one Advanced Development Model (ADM) and two Engineering and Manufacturing Development (EMD) units being built prior to cancellation.

In accordance with the Joint Electronics Type Designation System (JETDS), the "AN/SAR-8" designation represents the eighth design of an Army-Navy electronic device for a surface ship infrared receiver system. The JETDS system is also used to name some NATO and all Department of Defense electronic systems.

== Description ==
The IRSTD System was intended to provide a 360-degree automatic detection and track capability against multiple low elevation airborne threats along with detection of surface targets. It was also to have a secondary role in assisting with station keeping, classification of surface targets, and collision avoidance. As it was a passive detector, it could operate under radar jamming or strict emissions control conditions where the ship's radars could not. It could also see through surface clutter, which had been the primary obstacle to detecting and classifying sea-skimming missiles up to that point.

The sensor module in the ADM operated exclusively in the 3-5 micron band and was controlled by an AN/UYK-20 computer. The EMD units replaced this with a much higher resolution dual element sensor array which operated in both 3-5 micron and 8-12 micron bands, using the former for detection and the latter for thermal imaging. It also featured improved detect and track algorithms and was controlled by a more powerful AN/UYK-44 computer. Both had a standard scanning rate of 30 revolutions per minute and were cryogenically cooled with liquid nitrogen. The outsides of the sensor housings were heated to prevent the extreme temperature differential from forming condensation.

== History ==
Development of what was to become AN/SAR-8 traces its roots back to 1974, when Spar Aerospace began work on the Shipboard Passive Surveillance and Detection System for the Royal Canadian Navy with assistance from GE Aerospace and CDC. After the US Navy issued requirements for a similar system in 1975, negotiations to collaborate on development begun. This resulted in a memorandum of understanding (MOU) between the United States and Canada to build the ADM, which was signed in July 1976. Trials of the ADM began in May 1978 in Halifax, Nova Scotia and the unit was transferred to HMCS Algonquin in June for sea trials. April 1979 saw the ADM sent to Key West for American land trials, and the unit was installed on USS Kinkaid that September. Following this, the unit was shipped to Surface Warfare Research Center in Dahlgren, Virginia before being given over to the Naval Academic Center for Infrared Technology at the Naval Postgraduate School for research use in January 1984.

While full scale engineering development had been approved in June 1981, prolonged contract negotiations prevented further work until a new MOU was signed in January 1983, when the system was given its final name of IRSTD. The designation AN/SAR-8 was assigned in August 1984. The first EMD unit was delivered to the Pacific Missile Test Center for land trials in August 1989 which ran for 15 months. The second EMD unit was delivered to the US Navy in December 1990 for sea trials, which were conducted aboard USS Kinkaid and completed by mid 1991. Canadian trials conducted by Defence Research Establishment Valcartier and aboard a vessel of Maritime Forces Atlantic were intended to follow this, but did not take place.

Dogged by delays and budget overruns, the contract for the two EMD units which had initially been priced at 85.8 million CAD (66.3 million USD) in 1984 had ballooned to approximately 160 million USD (193 million CAD) by May 1992, with production scheduled to begin in 1994. At this point, the units were already deemed out of date — reliant on focal plane array technology and supporting electronics from 10 to 15 years prior, AN/SAR-8 was both heavier and substantially more expensive than contemporary designs which had started development later. This was made worse by the project's more ambitious design criteria, as the system was intended to detect and track targets for the much longer ranged RIM-7 Sea Sparrow and SM-2MR rather than the likes of the Goalkeeper CIWS targeted by Hollandse Signaalapparaten's IRSCAN system.

Aside from a brief offering by Spar and Loral Corporation of a substantially lightened AN/SAR-8 for the US Navy's Ship Self-Defense System (SSDS) program in 1992, IRSTD was confined to a research and development effort by this point. Both EMD units were transferred to the Surface Warfare Research Center for use as development aids in 1993, and in June of that year one of the sets was used as part of the SSDS Mk I trials aboard USS Whidbey Island at the Atlantic Fleet Weapons Test Facility. An AN/SAR-8 derivative with a new focal plane array, signal processing circuitry, and housing known as the Horizon Infrared Surveillance Sensor was slated to see service as part of SSDS Mk III at this time.
