= AN/UYK-8 =

1960s military computer by UNIVAC

The AN/UYK-8 was a UNIVAC computer built to replace the CP-808 (Marine Corps air cooled AN/USQ-20 variant) in the Beach Relay Link-11 communication system, the AN/TYQ-3 in a AN/TYA-20 shelter.

In accordance with the Joint Electronics Type Designation System (JETDS), the "AN/UYK-8" designation represents the 8th design of an Army-Navy electronic device for general utility data processing computing equipment. The JETDS system also now is used to name all Department of Defense electronic systems.

== Development ==
In April 1967, UNIVAC received a contract from the US Navy for design, development, testing and delivery of the AN/UYK-8 microelectronics computer for use with the AN/TYA-20.

== Technical ==
It used the same 30-bit words and instruction set as the AN/USQ-17 and AN/USQ-20 Naval Tactical Data System (NTDS) computers, built with "first generation integrated circuits". This made it about one quarter of the volume of the AN/USQ-20. It had two processors instead of just one.

Instructions were represented as 30-bit words, in the following format:

  f  6 bits   function code 
  j  3 bits   jump condition designator 
  k  3 bits   partial word designator 
  b  3 bits   which seven index register to use (B0=non used) 
  s  2 bits   which S (5bits) register to use S0,S1,S2,S3(P(17-13))
  y  13 bits  operand address in memory
  memory address = Bb + Ss + y = 18 bit (262,144 words)

Numbers were represented as full 30-bit words. This also allowed for five 6-bit alphanumeric characters per word.

The main memory was increased to 262,144 words (256K words) of magnetic-core memory.

The available processor registers were:

- one 30-bit arithmetic (A) register.
- a contiguous 30-bit Q register (total of 60 bits for the result of multiplication or the dividend in division).
- seven 30-bit index (B) registers.

== See also ==
- List of military electronics of the United States
- List of UNIVAC products
- History of computing hardware
- Joint Electronics Type Designation System
