= CDC logic module =

Modules used in CDC computers

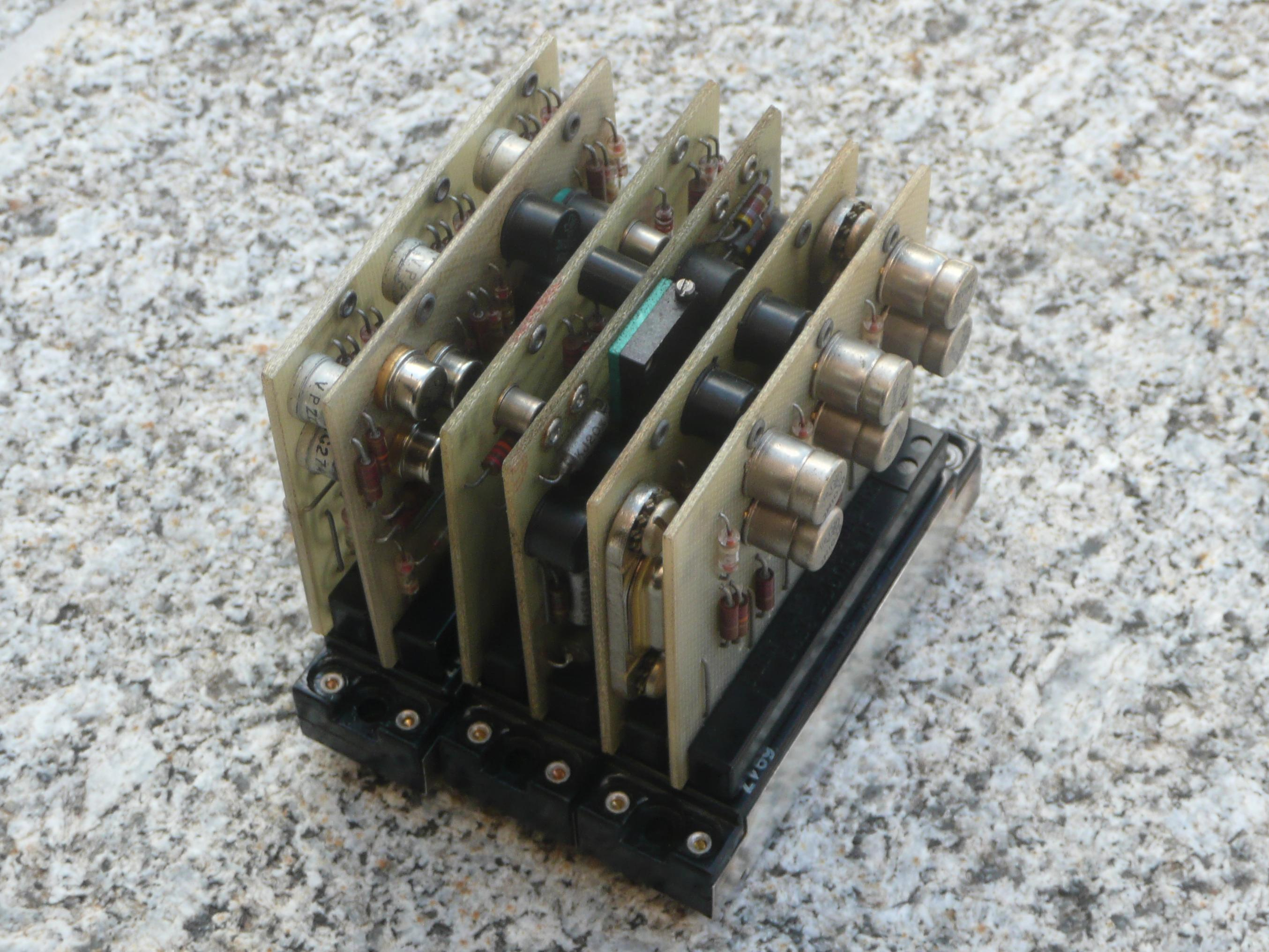
Early CDC circuit boards plugged into backplane connectors

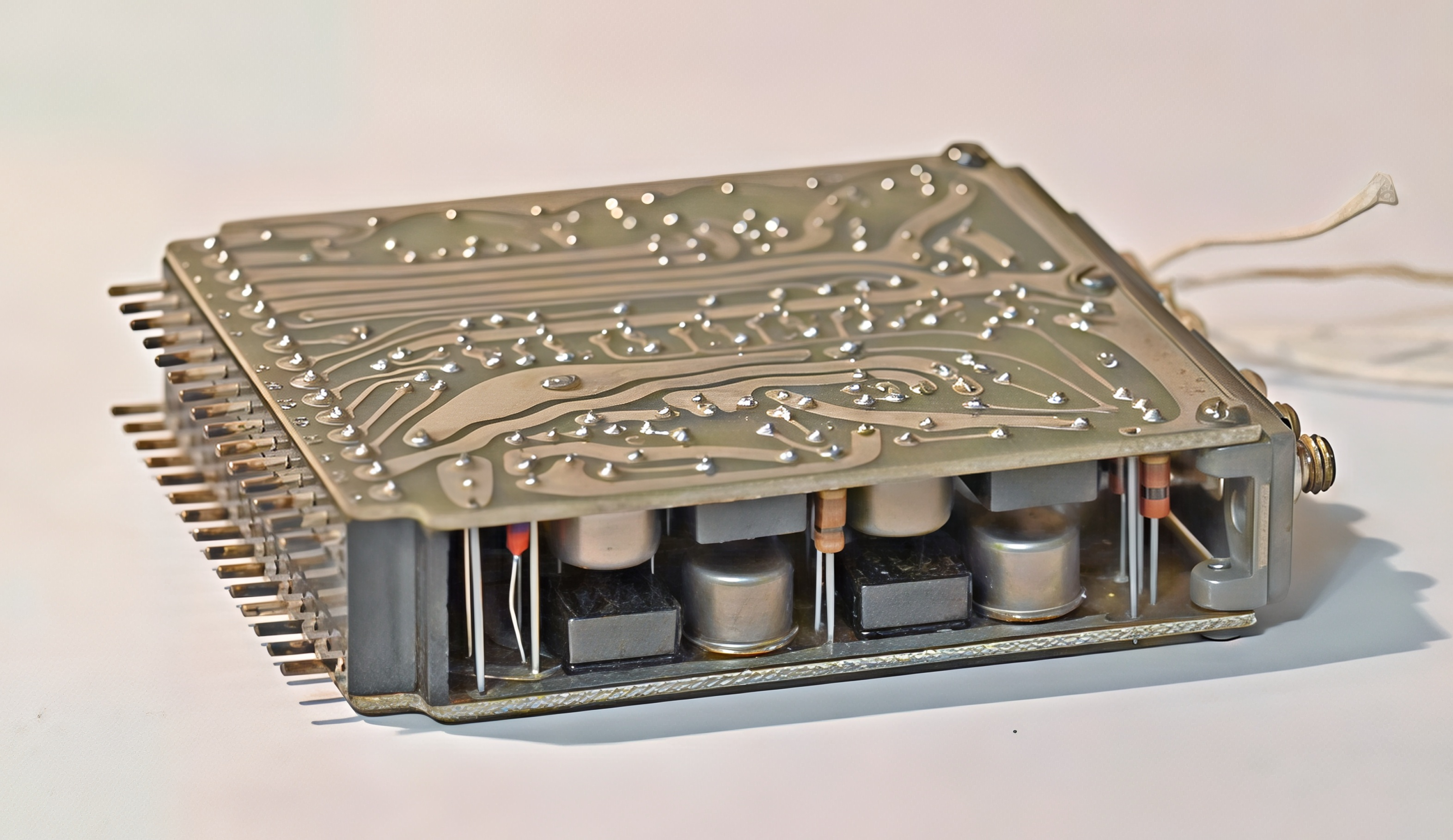
CDC cordwood module

The CDC logic module was set of components used in CDC computers in the 1960s.

When Seymour Cray joined Control Data Corporation in 1958, he had just finished work on the Univac M-460 computer, also known as the AN/USQ-17. This computer used very small circuit boards, each holding one logical building block, and Cray brought this board format with him to CDC.

As refined at CDC for use in the CDC 1604 and CDC 160, these building blocks were packaged on 2.5 by 2.125 inches (64 mm × 54 mm) circuit boards with a 15-pin male connector on one of the long edges. The power supply voltages were +15 V and −15 V, and the logic levels were −3 V and −0.5 V. Each inverter used two transistors with feedback used to prevent either from saturating. Diodes on both inputs and outputs allowed both Boolean AND and OR functions in the wiring between inverters.

Modules used on the CDC 6600 were compatible with the backplane connectors used with earlier machines, but modules could be 3 by 3 inches (76 mm × 76 mm) and some were double-thickness, occupying two adjacent backplane slots and built from two circuit boards with components hanging between them like cordwood.
