= Arthur A. Collins =

American radio engineer and businessman

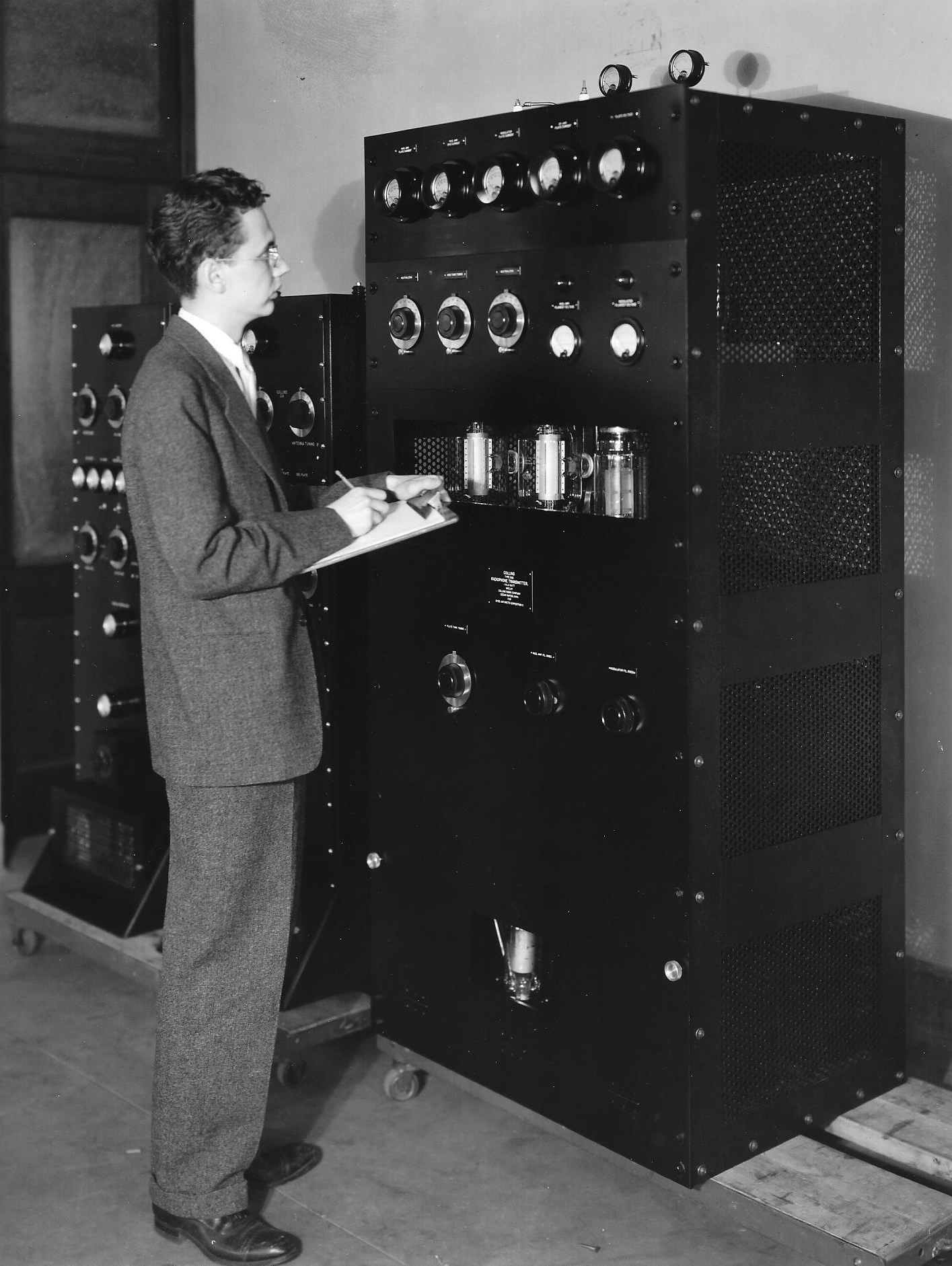
- Arthur A Collins standing next to a transmitter
- Born: September 9, 1909; Kingfisher, Oklahoma, U.S.
- Died: February 25, 1987 (aged 77)
- Education: Amherst college; Coe College in Cedar Rapids, IA
- Occupations: radio engineer, inventor, entrepreneur
- Known for: founder of Collins Radio Co.
- Spouses: Margaret (Peg) Van Dyke (m. 1930–1955) Mary Margaret Meis (m. 1957–1987)
- Children: 4
- Awards: Distinguished Public Service Award, US Navy. (1962)

Arthur Andrews Collins (September 9, 1909 – February 25, 1987) was an American radio engineer and entrepreneur. He first gained national recognition as a teenager for significant advances in radio communication. He later founded his own radio engineering and manufacturing company in 1933, Collins Radio Co. Rapidly expanding during World War II, Collins Radio eventually grew into a Fortune 500 leader in avionics, telecommunication, and military, space and commercial radio communications. Collins and his company ultimately became pioneers in melding computer and communication technology.

== Early life and education ==
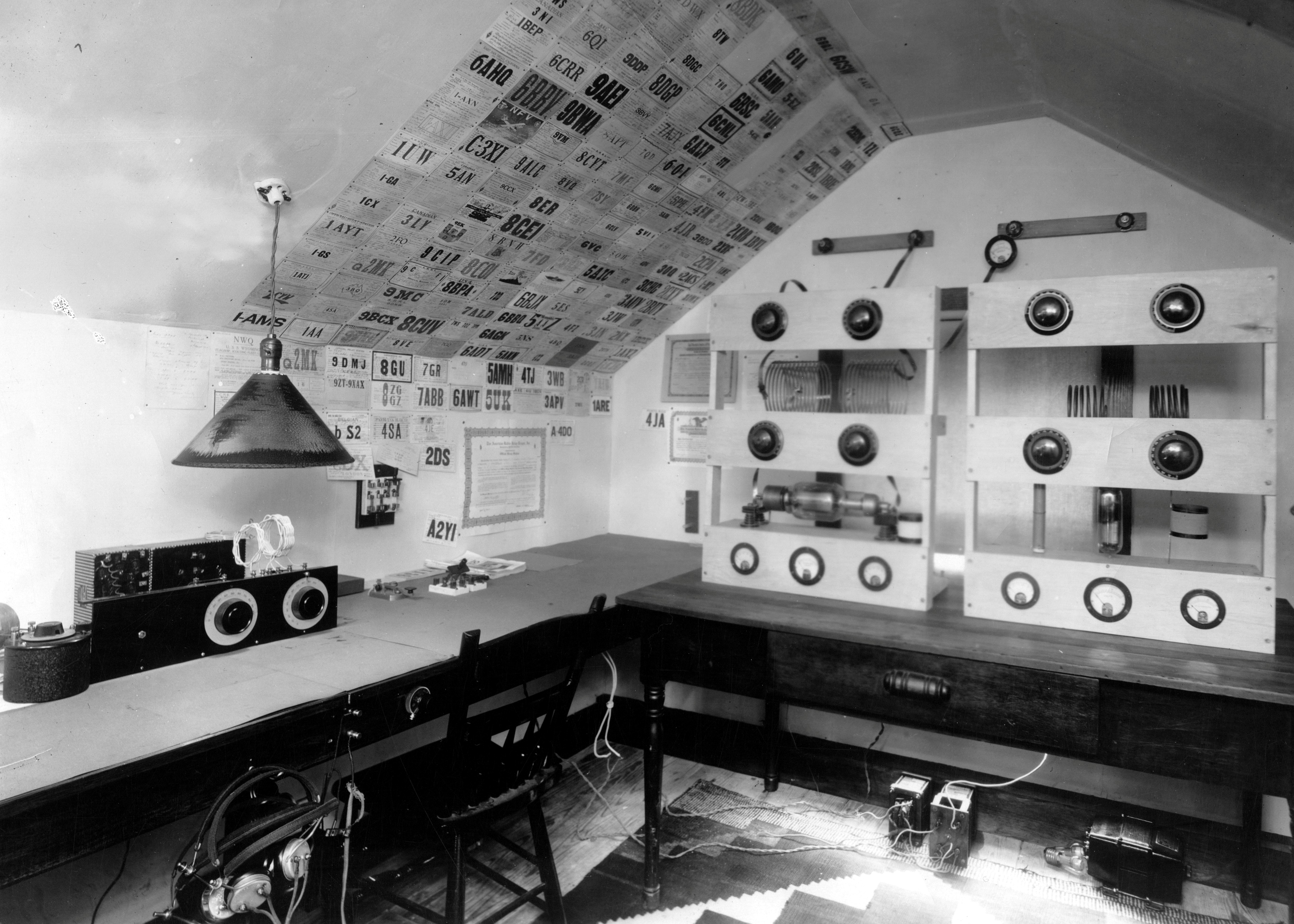
A young Arthur Collins's attic ham radio station; his radio communication was a critical link to the outside world for the 1925 MacMillan Expedition to the subarctic.

Arthur A. Collins was born in Kingfisher, Oklahoma, to Merle H. Collins, a mortgage banker and Faith Andrews Collins, a graduate of Rockford College in Illinois. The family moved to Cedar Rapids, Iowa, when Arthur was 7. His father founded Collins Farms Company in 1925, which combined inefficient small farms into one collective enterprise, using the best available equipment and modern practices like contour plowing and erosion control, crop rotation, newly available hybrid seed corn to achieve greatly increased productivity. This novel approach was initially successful but faltered as the Great Depression hit.

Arthur was intensely interested in radio, became a licensed amateur radio operator at age 14, and designed and built his own equipment, purchasing expensive vacuum tubes with his father's help. Arthur Collins became an expert in circuit design and wave propagation, publishing several articles in specialty journals.

Collins became friends with fellow amateur radio "hams", including John Reinartz, who shared a special interest in radio wave propagation. Within the radio spectrum only longer waves were thought to be refracted by the atmosphere ("skip"), allowing long-distance communication at night, but not so the shorter wavelength relegated to amateurs. Reinartz and Collins discovered that such "skip" did occur in the 20-meter range and during the daytime, which allowed long-distance communication with this type of equipment. When Reinartz became the ship's radio operator on the National Geographic-sponsored MacMillan Arctic expedition in 1925 only he and Collins were able to maintain reliable communication, unlike the U.S. Navy using longer wavelengths. Collins gained national recognition.

Arthur Collins graduated from high school in Cedar Rapids and attended Amherst college in Massachusetts, but returned at the end of his freshman year. He never obtained a degree, but rather took courses at the University of Iowa and at Coe College in Cedar Rapids. He is known to have traveled in the late 1930s to Iowa State College to visit John V. Atanasoff, the acknowledged inventor of the first digital computer, although unfortunately, no records exist of their discussions.

Collins own studies, and research done during the early years of his own company, typically outpaced advances in electronics coursework in academia. Yet he valued higher education, promoting programs for his employees to further their education, and even establishing courses with in-house instructors at Collins Radio.

== Career ==
=== Founding of Collins Radio in Iowa ===
Collins founded Collins Radio Co. in 1933, building high quality amateur and commercial transmitters, and receivers for the domestic market. With recognition from success with the MacMillan expedition, Collins equipment was selected for the Byrd Expedition to the Antarctic (1933–1934). Collins Radio was recognized for excellence in design and manufacture of amateur and commercial transmitters and receivers. It began building aircraft radios in 1935. Beginning manufacturing in his basement, Collins soon rented building space.

=== Goddard, RCA, and the Collins vacuum tube patent suit, 1933-1938 ===
The heart of a radio transmitter, the oscillator, at that time used a vacuum tube to generate a radio frequency. Radio Corporation of America claimed it had exclusive rights to the Lee De Forest vacuum tube oscillator circuit patent, and brought suit against Collins Radio and other purported infringers. When Arthur Collins discovered that Robert Goddard 's 1915 oscillator patent predated the de Forest patent Collins met with Goddard to explain that RCA's tube monopoly was a serious impediment to competitive innovation in electronics. With Goddard's help, the practicality of the Goddard design was demonstrated in court; the suit was dropped in 1938, allowing Collins and others to freely develop new technology. Goddard and Collins remained friends until Goddard's death in 1945.

=== World War II ===
Collins eventually constructed the first Collins Radio factory in Cedar Rapids in 1940. At this time the company had sales of about $500,000 and 150 employees. During World War II Collins Radio became a key supplier of ground, ship, and aircraft communication equipment, expanding from about 350 to a peak of about 3700 employees. Arthur Collins was a co-designer of the Autotune device. Invented for commercial aviation shortly before the war, it allowed the pilot to remotely switch to preset frequencies. Autotune precisely adjusted the radio in about 40 seconds, without the lengthy hand-tuning normally required by a designated radio operator. The ART-13 100-watt HF military radio was highly prized for this feature and for its rugged and reliable construction. Over 90,000 were built for B-24, B-25, B-29, TBF, and other aircraft. Collins gear was also extensively used for tactical ground communication and aboard ships. Following the Pearl Harbor attack, the Corregidor station in the Philippines used Collins equipment to reach the outside world, as did the USS Missouri during the surrender ceremonies in Tokyo Bay.

=== Post-war ===
Advances in aviation during World War II led to the rapid post-war expansion of commercial and private aviation. Collins Radio quickly shifted from war-time projects to building communication equipment for the airlines and corporate fleets. A licensed pilot in his 20s, Collins led the pioneering development of the horizontal situation indicator (HSI) and other integrated flight instruments that combined in one display the pitch, roll, and yaw attitudes of the aircraft as well as its compass heading. Collins Radio became a world leader in avionics during the 1950s and 1960s. The 618T HF transceiver was a mainstay for the airlines and the ARC-27, with automatic tuning and 1750 channels, was the first practical UHF military transceiver, in service for over two decades.

=== Telecommunication expansion to Texas and California, 1950-1970 ===
Collins expanded his operations to Dallas and Burbank, California in the 1950s. In California he formed a research group under the direction of Mel Doelz to develop new methods of encoding or modulating voice and data signals with precisely shaped pulses that formed a binary code. Such techniques make very efficient use of bandwidth and virtually eliminate the noise and signal distortion that often plagues conventional radio. Based on this research, the Collins KINEPLEX long-distance telecommunication system offered in 1955 up to 40 channels compared to one voice or data channel in the same bandwidth with conventional telephone service. A key component of KINEPLEX was the world's first practical, mass-produced MODEM (modulator/demodulator), in essence, a translator between binary and analog signals. The classified Collins Naval Tactical Data System (NTDS) derived from this work.

Collins was among the first to predict the coming computer and telecommunication revolution and led his engineers to combine the lessons of KINEPLEX with communication expertise to establish in the early 1960s a data and message switching facility in Cedar Rapids, using Collins C8400 computers to process a reservation and other data traffic for the airlines. Collins Radio also designed and built microwave communications systems, supplying both the basic equipment and also relay towers, often in remote, mountain top locations, to transmit the line-of-sight signal over long distances.

=== Later life, 1972-1987 ===
After leaving Collins Radio in 1972, Collins formed a private research and development firm in Dallas, Texas, called Arthur A. Collins Inc ( A.A.C. Inc.). He hired a few key people, some from the old Collins Radio C-System group. His interest was in telecommunication and computer networks, specifically digital switch design for telephone networks, and later computer network design, which he titled "Integrated Service Network" (ISN). AACI developed its own internal email system in 1981, called "Command I". ["I" may stand for 'interconnect'.] Collins published a book on telecommunication entitled "A Time for Innovation", co-authored with Robert Pedersen, and his firm eventually was awarded several patents, some posthumously. Collins worked until his death from a stroke in 1987, having lived long enough to see the advent of the personal computer, the fiber optic cable, and the beginning of the internet.

== Work ==
=== SSB and amateur radios ===
Amateur radio was never a dominant segment within the Collins Radio product line, but held a special interest for Arthur Collins since childhood and provided a key catalyst in the design of other equipment. Collin's amateur gear was always built to the highest standards and demanded a premium price. As part of KINEPLEX Collins developed the mechanical filter, a small device about ¾ inch by 4 inches using a series of precisely ground metallic discs linked mechanically and electrically. Determining the exact dimensions of these discs was critically important, and not easily discovered through empirical experimentation. A bright, young Indian mathematician named Roshan Sharma was fortuitously hired, based partly on his recent mastery of the necessary underlying mathematics needed to produce the resonating discs.

An input signal causes the first disc to mechanically resonate at a very precise and stable frequency, which passes an induced electrical oscillation to the next disc and in turn sequentially through the device. By filtering out unnecessary portions of the radio signal, the mechanical filter (a kind of "bandpass filter") allows the use of a very stable, precise single sideband frequency. (Previously, single sideband operation required a large, complex piece of equipment.) The mechanical filter was the heart of Collins single sideband (SSB) technology and made SSB practical for the first time. SSB offered clear, efficient radio communications, even during conditions that would disrupt and distort conventional radio signals.

In 1956 a SAC C-97 transport was fitted with Collins 75A-4 / KWM-1 SSB amateur gear for a demonstration of the superiority of SSB, leading to contracts for Collins SSB military equipment on B-52 and other aircraft, as well as ground stations. Sales far exceeded that of amateur sets.

=== Antenna design ===
Collins antenna design and development began in 1951 with the challenging design and construction of a 50-ft. diameter parabolic "dish" antenna for the Naval Research Laboratory in Washington DC. Collins antenna expertise expanded in the following years to include pioneering designs for satellites, deep space ground stations, HF ground communication, aircraft communication and navigation, spacecraft, commercial broadcast, microwave, and other special applications.

=== Space communication ===
Collins Radio entered the field of space communications very early when in 1951 it designed and built an ultra-high frequency 20-kW transmitter on 418 MHz coupled to a high gain antenna with an unusual tapered horn shape, installed at its facilities at the Cedar Rapids Airport. On November 8, 1951, two-way communications with a similar station at Sterling, Virginia was established for the first time by reflecting the UHF signal off the moon. The message "What hath God wrought?" was exchanged several times using Morse code over the half-million-mile path.

Collins Radio pioneered satellite communications in 1960 by constructing two large ground stations at its facilities in Cedar Rapids, IA, and Richardson, TX. NASA launched the balloon-like ECHO I passive satellite on August 12, 1960. On its third orbital pass over the Midwest, Collins became the first to establish two-way satellite voice communications by reflecting 10 kW signals at 810 MHz off the satellite. Six days later Collins became the first to transmit an image - of President Eisenhower - via satellite between its two stations.

Beginning with the X-15 experimental rocket plane, Collins Radio supplied radio communication equipment to NASA for Mercury, Gemini, and Apollo spacecraft, as well as ground stations and HF links to Mission Control. All American voices from space, as well as TV and data, were transmitted by Collins equipment. Peak sales for space communication systems were $69 million in 1966..

=== Computer systems ===
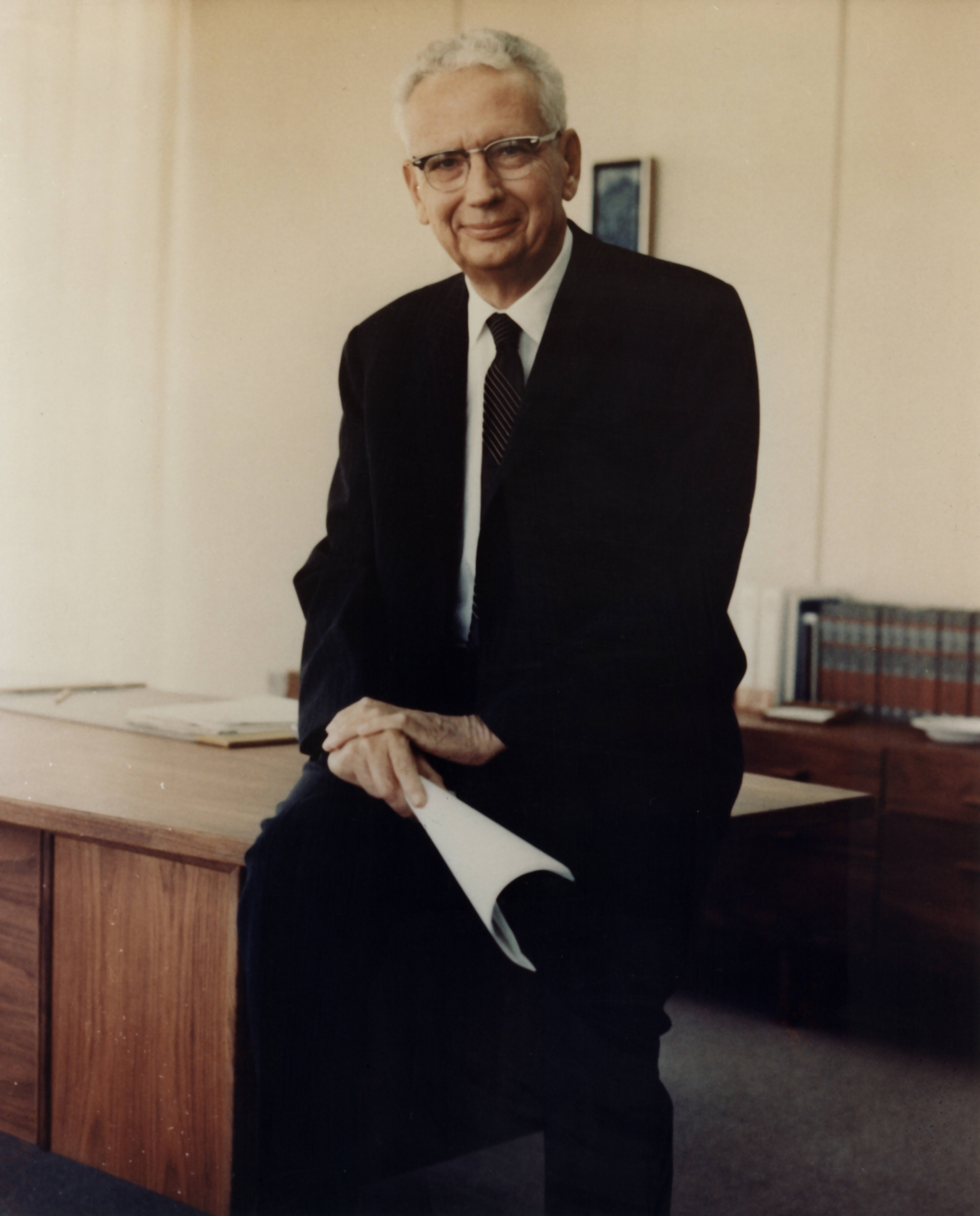
Collins circa 1970

Collins's interest in computers predated his company's entry into this field. Arthur Collins had predicted in 1957 the need to combine computers with communication, using some of the technology developed as part of KINEPLEX and related work. Company sales increased through the 1960s, by 1968 reaching $440,000,000 ($4.1 billion in today's currency) and employing 24,000. With this available capital, Collins Radio entered the computer market in the 1960s.

Under Collins's supervision, Collins Radio introduced the C8400 computer system, built using rack-mounted circuit cards, an unusual feature for computers of the day. A large computer communication center was established in Cedar Rapids in the 1960s, switching reservation data for the airlines, as well as in-house company data, with links to Dallas, Texas, and Newport Beach in California.

The next generation of C8500 computer used units similar to "black boxes" in avionics as part of a modular design. A Process Division was formed that combined the design and manufacture of planar circuit boards into one organization. Collins integrated circuits and other microelectronic components were mounted on Collins-built circuit boards. Modular construction allowed an easy expansion of computer capability in response to demand and provided benefits in manufacture and maintenance (boxes could be swapped). The Process Division and modular construction concepts were revolutionary, examples of the culture of innovation at Collins Radio, and a direct result of Collins's vision.

Collins was intensely involved in these efforts, bringing in outside telecommunication experts, and setting up classes for the study of computer architecture and software design. The result was the "C-System", a distributed, ring network linking processors and peripheral equipment and functions, including manufacturing devices, inventory control, purchasing, and other administrative activities. Contemporary systems used IBM 360 or similar computers in highly centralized centers, serving only a few functions, and not linked to other similar centers. The C-System was designed to be flexible, able to expand to meet diverse needs, and accessible by a variety of users, not just computer specialists.

The C-System was innovative, but—as a consequence—its scope and costs could not be predicted. Eventually, it disrupted other programs and led to serious cost overruns that went beyond funding sources. One of the main difficulties was the large size, relatively low density, and very high cost of computer memory, as demanded by the C-System.

Collins's vision of the potential for the C-System exceeded that of most of his staff, and certainly that of bankers or other funding sources. In spite of the negative effect on the company's finances, he insisted on continuing the development of the C-System, certain that it would be an eventual success. Unfortunately, the overall economy was in recession in the late 1960s, especially for highly specialized commercial and defense electronics. (For example, employment at Boeing dropped from 100,000 in 1968 to 32,500 in 1971. Lights out, Seattle; Seattle Times, November 3, 1996). A difficult decision was made to form an alliance with North American Rockwell. Unable to meet short-term financial goals, Arthur Collins was forced to leave the company in 1971.

His vision of a distributed network of relatively small processors and computer work stations, however, was prescient in the end. The seeds of the linked personal computers and of the Internet were to be found in the C-System. Computer memory quickly became faster, of higher capacity, and cheaper, but not soon enough to rescue the C-System.

== Personal life ==
In 1930 Arthur Collins married Margaret (Peg) Van Dyke in Cedar Rapids, a noted artist within her community and a former student of Grant Wood. They had two children, Susan, born in 1939, and Michael, born in 1943. Margaret died suddenly of a cerebral hemorrhage in 1955. Arthur remarried in 1957, to Mary Margaret Meis, assistant director of dietetics at Mercy Hospital. They had two sons, Alan, born 1963, and David, born 1966.

Collins maintained two residences, one in Cedar Rapids, Iowa, and another in Dallas, Texas, where he lived following the sale of Collins Radio to Rockwell International. Collins also kept his boat, 70-foot custom-built fiberglass yacht, The Peregrine, in Newport Beach, California. This was his office and home during visits to the Newport Beach facility, and featured a large central "conference room".

== Awards ==
1942. US Army/Navy "E" award given to Collins Radio.
1950. Honorary Doctorate of Science, Cornell College, Mt. Vernon, Iowa.
1954. Honorary Doctorate of Science, Coe College, Cedar Rapids, Iowa.
1962. Distinguished Public Service Award, US Navy.
1966. Distinguished Service Award, Iowa Broadcasters Association.
1967. Distinguished Service Award, University of Iowa.
1968. Honorary Doctorate of Engineering, Polytechnic Institute of Brooklyn N.Y.
1968. Elected to the National Academy of Engineering
1969. Community Builder Award of the Cedar Rapids Lodge of B'Nai B'Rith
1970. Honorary Doctor of Engineering Degree from Southern Methodist University, Dallas, Texas.
1974. Honorary Doctor of Science Degree, Mount Mercy College, Cedar Rapids, Iowa.
1977. Armstrong Award. Radio Club of America.
1982. Governor's Science Medal. State of Iowa.
1982. Pioneer Award, Aerospace and Electronics Systems Society of the Institute of Electrical and Electronics Engineers.

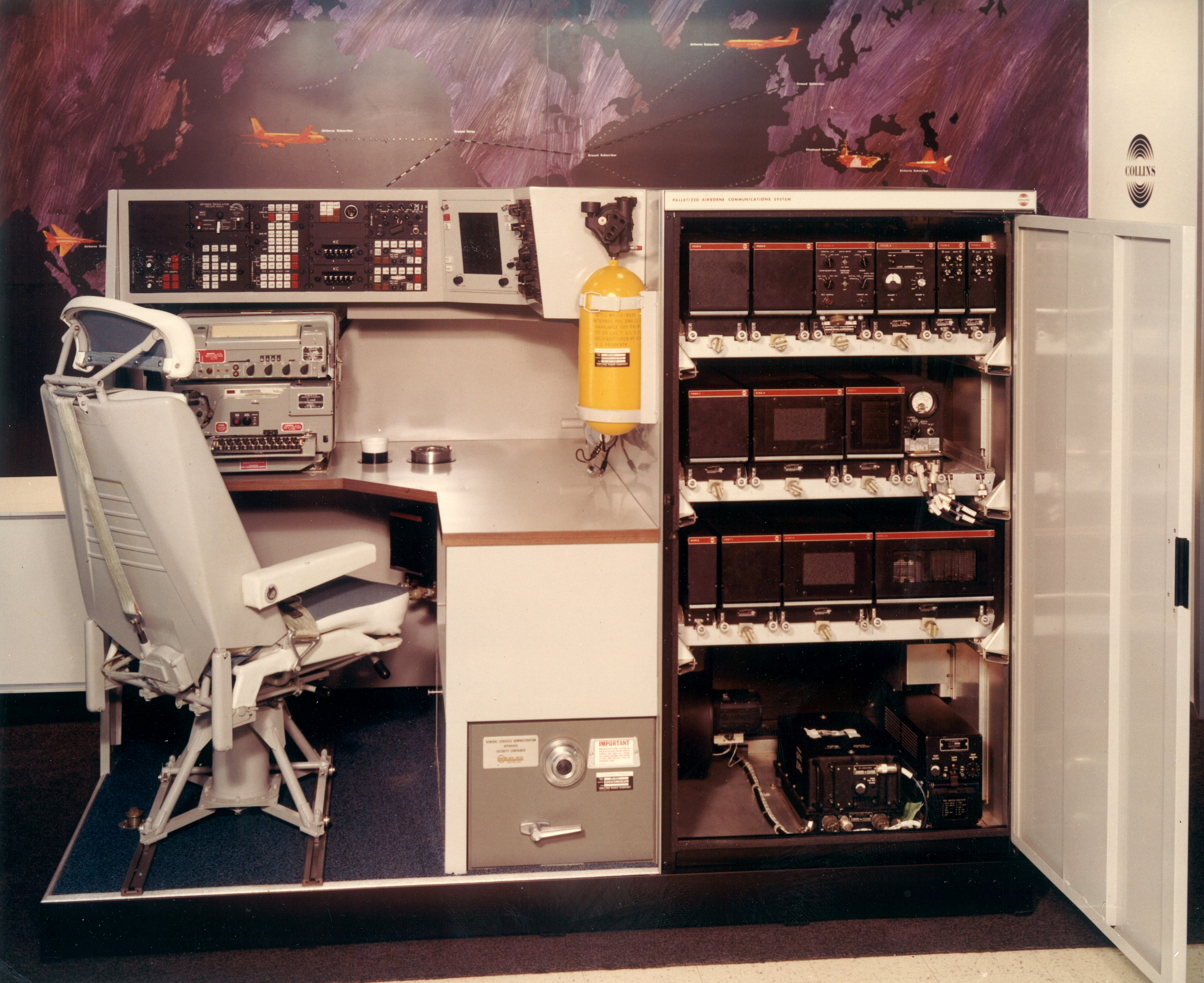

Airborne command & control communication station, using modular "black box" construction, circa 1969. Circuits within modules are a planar design of multiple boards, which are themselves multilayer, mounting Collins microelectronic components. Collins computers shared these features. Both design and manufacture were done within a single Process Systems division. All these design and manufacture innovations were a direct product of Arthur Collins's creativity.

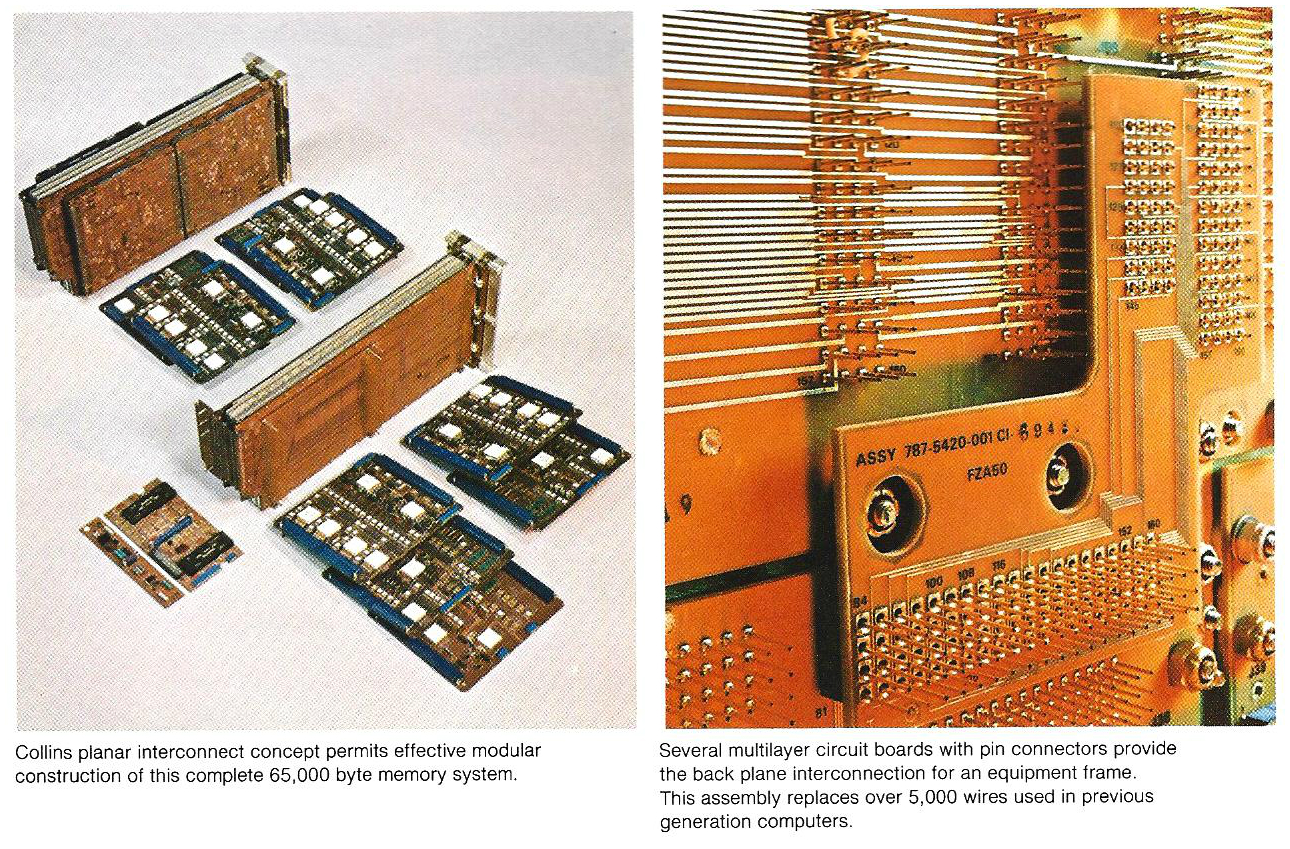

== Patents ==
The following are Patents held Solely or Shared by Arthur Collins:

- 2,150,362, March 14, 1939 – Collins Circuits for Signal Transmitting and Receiving.
- 2,164,309, July 4, 1939 – Shaft Positioning Device.
- 2,165,226, July 11, 1939 – Automatic Tuning System.
- 2,168,326, August 8, 1939 – Automatic Tuning System.
- 2,174,552, October 3, 1939 – Automatic Tuning System
- 2,186,958, January 16, 1940 – Distortion Reducing System for Suppressed Carrier Transmission.
- RE 22, 574, June 9, 1942 – Control Systems and Apparatus
- 2,185,414, June 9, 1942 – Motor Control System
- 2,393,856, January 29, 1946 – Calibration System for Radio Receivers.
- 2,409,192, November 15, 1946 – Tuning Device Clutch.
- 2,447,490, August 24, 1943 – Radio Transmitting and Receiving Systems.
- 2,509,963, May 30, 1950 – Shaft Positioning Apparatus.
- 2,617,985, November 11, 1952 – Frequency Control System.
- D 170,183, August 18, 1953 – Approach Horizon.
- D 170,184, August 18, 1953 – Course Indicator.
- 2,888,524, May 26, 1959 – Parasitic Oscillation Suppressor.
- 2,921,271, January 12, 1960 – Transmitter Stabilizer.
- 3,651,315, March 25, 1972 – Digital Products Inspection System.
- 3,659,271, April 25, 1972 – Multichannel Communication System.
- 3,692,941, September 19, 1972 – Data Exchange and Coupling Apparatus.
- 3,925,651, December 9, 1975 – Digital Circuit Switched Time-Space-Time Switch Equipped Time Division Transmission Loop System.
- 3,956,593, May 11, 1976 – Time-Space-Time Switch with Combined and Distributed State Store and Control Store.
- 4,005,272, January 25, 1977 – Time Folded Time-Space-Time Switch.
- 4,038,497, July 26, 1977 – Hardwired Control Logic and Automatic Path Finding Set Up and Release.
- 4,270,203, May 26, 1981 – Timing Adjustment Circuit for Digital Switching.
- 4,701,907, October 20, 1987 – Dynamically Reconfigurable Time-Space-Time Digital Switch and Network.
- 4,797,589, January 10, 1989 – Dynamically Reconfigurable Time-Space-Time Digital Switch and Network.

In addition to U.S. Patents, Collins had 43 Patents in 13 foreign countries.
