= AN/USQ-20 =

Early computer designed for the U S Navy

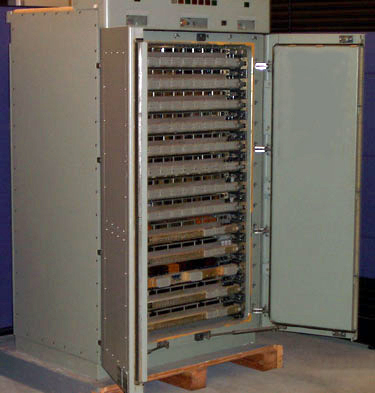
The AN/USQ-20 computer.

The AN/USQ-20, or CP-642 or Naval Tactical Data System (NTDS), was designed as a more reliable replacement for the Seymour Cray-designed AN/USQ-17 with the same instruction set. The first batch of 17 computers were delivered to the Navy starting in early 1961.

A version of the AN/USQ-20 for use by the other military services and NASA was designated the UNIVAC 1206. Another version, designated the G-40, replaced the vacuum tube UNIVAC 1104 in the BOMARC Missile Program.

In accordance with the Joint Electronics Type Designation System (JETDS), the "AN/USQ-20" designation represents the 20th design of an Army-Navy electronic device for general utility special combination equipment. The JETDS system also now is used to name all Department of Defense electronic systems.

== Technical ==
The machine was the size and shape of an old-fashioned double-door refrigerator, about six feet tall (roughly 1.80 meters).

Instructions were represented as 30-bit words in the following format:

  f  6 bits   function code 
  j  3 bits   jump condition designator 
  k  3 bits   partial word designator 
  b  3 bits   which index register to use 
  y  15 bits  operand address in memory

Numbers were represented as 30-bit words. This allowed for five 6-bit alphanumeric characters per word.

The main memory was 32,768 words of core memory.

The available processor registers were:

- One 30-bit arithmetic (A) register.
- A contiguous 30-bit Q register (total of 60 bits for the result of multiplication or the dividend in division).
- Seven 15-bit index (B) registers (note: register B0 is always zero).

== See also ==
- List of military electronics of the United States
- CMS-2
- List of UNIVAC products
- History of computing hardware
- Military computers
