= AN/UYK-44 =

Type of minicomputer

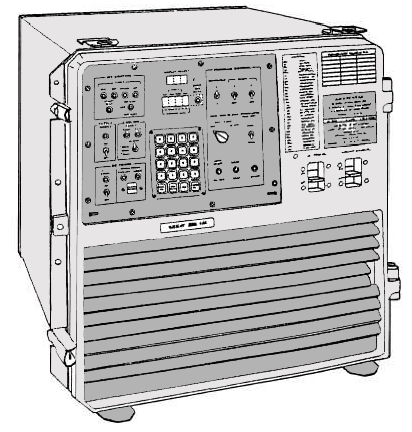
AN/UYK-44

The AN/UYK-44 was the standard 16-bit minicomputer of the United States Navy developed in the early 1980s by Sperry Corporation and was completed in early 1984. The AN/UYK-44 was used in surface ships, submarines, ground C4I platforms, radar and missile control systems. The system was designed to replace the older AN/UYK-20 model.

In accordance with the Joint Electronics Type Designation System (JETDS), the "AN/UYK-44" designation represents the 44th design of an Army-Navy electronic device for general utility data processing computing equipment. The JETDS system also now is used to name all Department of Defense electronic systems.

== Technical specifications ==
The AN/UYK-44 had 2 million words of memory, approximately 4 MB in modern terms, and operated at 0.9 MIPS.

The system has relatively large I/O capability and has a MIL-STD-1397 point-to-point I/O bus running at 250K words/s. The system was built around the use of "Standard Electronic Modules" (SEM) for logic implementation. These modules had double-sided surface mount integrated circuits and ceramic substrates for interconnect and cooling.

== See also ==
- AN/AYK-14
- AN/UYK-20
- CMS-2 programming language
- List of military electronics of the United States
