= Naval Tactical Data System =

US Navy information processing system

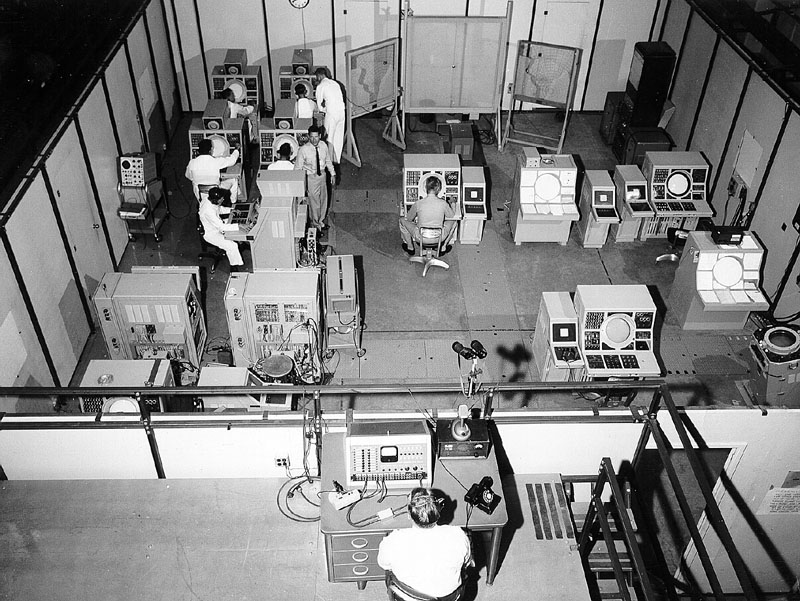
NTDS training in a mock-up of a shipboard CIC

Naval Tactical Data System (NTDS) was a computerized information processing system developed by the United States Navy in the 1950s and first deployed in the early 1960s for use in combat ships. It took reports from multiple sensors on different ships and aircraft and collated it to produce a single unified map of the battlespace. This information could then be relayed back to the ships and to the weapons operators.

== Reason for development ==
=== Background ===
Warships have compartments known as Combat Information Centers, or CICs, that collect, sort and then communicate all of the battlefield information known to that ship. Information about targets would be forwarded to the CIC by the operators of the radar and sonar systems, where crewmen would use this information to update a shared map. Commanders used the map to direct weapons to particular targets. The system was similar to the Battle of Britain Bunker system, but on a smaller scale.

There were two major problems with this system. One was that each ship had its own view of the battlespace, independent of the rest of the ships in the task force. This led to force allocation problems - the ship with the right weapon for a particular target might not see that target on their sensors, or two ships might attempt to attack the same target while ignoring another. This could be addressed by adding inter-ship radio or flag signals as another input to the map, but the workload of moving so many bits of data was enormous. This led to the second major problem, the high inherent manpower requirements and lack of shipboard space.

During World War II and the immediate post-war era, major navies started studying these problems in depth, as concerns about coordinated attacks by long-range high-speed aircraft became a serious threat. To give the task force enough reaction time to deal with these threats, "pickets" were posted at a distance from the force to allow their radars to pick up the targets while still on the approach. The information from these ships then had to be relayed, normally by voice, to the other ships in the force. Some experiments with video cameras pointed at the radar displays were tried, but were subject to transmission loss when the ships pitched on the swells and the high-bandwidth antennas no longer pointed at each other.

What was ultimately desired was a system that could collect target information from any sensor in the fleet, use that to build a single shared picture of the battlespace, and then distribute that data accurately and automatically to all of the ships. As the data was now being collected almost entirely from electronic devices and displays, a system that picked up this data directly from those displays would be ideal.

=== Previous systems ===
Devised to be used in conjunction with the Type 984 radar, the first such system was developed by the Royal Navy in the immediate post-war era using analog systems that tracked the rate of motion of "blips" on radar screens. The operators used a joystick to align a pointer with the target and then pushed a button to update the location. The circuitry then adjusted the rate of predicted movement of the blip and displayed a pointer that moved over time. Updating no longer required any inputs, unless the predicted motion began to differ at which point additional button pushes could be used to update it. The data for each of these tracks, a series of voltages, could then be transmitted around the ship, and later, inter-ship transmission using pulse-code modulation. Ralph Benjamin found that decoding the position of the joystick was not ideal and desired a system that read out relative motion instead of absolute position, and invented the trackball as a solution. The Type 984 radar and Comprehensive Display System (CDS) were fitted to the aircraft carriers Eagle, Hermes and Victorious

This work suffered from the reliability of the analog circuits used to run the system. By the early 1950s the digital computer appeared to offer a solution, not only by greatly increasing reliability through the removal of any moving parts, but also by directly working with the digital data that made up the plots. Data from one computer simply needed to be copied directly to another, there was no need to code and decode analog signals representing those values. The Royal Canadian Navy began work on such a system under their DATAR project, which included the first working example of the trackball concept. Unfortunately their design used tubes, and the resulting machine was so large it took up almost all of the free space on the Bangor-class minesweeper it was installed on. Efforts to build a transistorized version of the DATAR did not receive funding and the project ended.

=== System implementation ===
The work by the RN and RCN teams was well known to the USN starting as early as 1946, and included live demonstrations of the Canadian system on Lake Ontario. They also built their own version of the Royal Navy's concept as the "Electronic Data System", and 20 sets were eventually produced by Motorola. In 1953 they produced a new system for air direction known as the "Intercept Tracking and Control Console" which could track two incoming and two outgoing (interceptor) formations. However, the system was huge and did not include inter-ship transmission, so was only used on a small number of aircraft carriers.

However, all of these solutions had problems that limited their usefulness. Analog systems were difficult to keep operational and subject to errors when maintenance was less than perfect. The Canadian version, using digital computers, was better, but needed to be transistorized. The US Air Force was also involved in their own Project Charles, a similar system but on a much larger scale. Their system also used vacuum tubes and would end up being the largest computers ever built, each occupying 20,000 square feet (1,900 m^{2}) of floor space, weighing 150 short tons (140 t), and consuming 1.5 megawatts of electrical power. The Navy kept a watchful eye on these developments and others under Project Cosmos.

Development of computers in the mid-1950s led both by the Navy's long interest in code-breaking computers, the introduction of newer types of transistors, and the widespread introduction of core memory, reached a point where a Navy version of Air Force's SAGE air defense network was a practical possibility. The Navy began development of the NTDS system using a transistorized digital computer in 1956. With NTDS and wireless data links, ships could share the information gathered by their sensors with other ships in a task force. In October 1961, NTDS was on the USS Oriskany carrier and the USS King and USS Mahan destroyers as service test ships. First production NTDS runs were ordered for 17 high priority ships with missiles including 10 Belknap-class cruisers under construction between 1962-67. NTDS was the inspiration for the Aegis system in the 1980s.

== Hardware description ==
A variety of UNIVAC embedded computers, including the first fielded version of the late 1950s, the CP-642A (AN/USQ-20), typically with 30 bit words, 32K words of magnetic core or thin film memory, 16 parallel I/O channels (also 30 bits wide) connected to radars and other peripherals, and a RISC-like instruction set, were used. Logic circuits used discrete transistors and other elements soldered to a printed circuit board with connectors running along one side. Each card was coated in a varnish-like substance to prevent exposure to corrosion-inducing salt spray (See Conformal Coating). A number of cards were connected and secured to a tray on rollers. In turn, several trays of various types, interconnected and secured to a metal enclosure, constituted the computer. Most NTDS computers were water-cooled, though some later lighter-weight models were air-cooled.

== Modem description ==
The NTDS information was transmitted between ships and aircraft of aircraft carrier battle groups using Collins Radio's Kineplex modems. Kineplex was a parallel-tone, multicarrier modem.

== Seymour Cray and the NTDS ==
Seymour Cray is credited for developing the first NTDS processor, the AN/USQ-17. However, this design did not go into production.

== ASW Ships Command & Control System ==
ASW Ships Command & Control System (ASWSC&CS) was a NTDS system for antisubmarine warfare (ASW). It was implemented only on the frigates USS Voge, USS Koelsch and the ASW aircraft carrier USS Wasp in 1967. The ASWSC&CS allowed the development of improvements in antisubmarine warfare using digital computers, which were implemented in other ASW ship classes. UNIVAC was contracted to define the hardware and develop the software to incorporate ASW functions.

AN/UYQ-100 Undersea Warfare Decision Support System (USW-DSS) is the current system fielded in 2010.

== See also ==
- Command and control centers:
  - Air Defense Control Center
  - Combat Information Center
  - Mission Control Center
  - National Emergency Command Post Afloat
- Computers:
  - 30 & 32 bit computers used in the NTDS
    - AN/USQ-17
    - AN/USQ-20
    - AN/UYK-8
    - AN/UYK-7
    - AN/UYK-43
  - 16 bit computers used in alternate and related roles
    - AN/UYK-20
    - AN/AYK-14
    - AN/UYK-44
- Collins Radio's Kineplex Multicarrier Modem
- Advanced combat direction system
- H/ZKJ
- Marine Tactical Data System
- Ship Self-Defense System
- Joint Tactical Information Distribution System
- Tactical communications
- MIL-STD-1397
- Over-the-horizon radar
- CMS-2 programming language
