= MIL-STD-1397 =

MIL-STD-1397 standard was issued by the United States Department of Defense (DoD) to define "the requirements for the physical, functional and electrical characteristics of a standard I/O data interface for digital data." The MIL-STD-1397 classification types A, B and D apply specifically to the Naval Tactical Data System (NTDS).

== Overview ==
=== Types ===
MIL-STD-1397 defines several 'Types' (A to K)

- Type A (NTDS Slow)- Parallel data transfer of up to 41667 words per second on one cable.
- Type B (NTDS Fast) - Parallel data transfer of up to 250000 words per second on one cable.
- Type C (ANEW) - Parallel data transfer of up to 250000 words per second on one cable.
- Type D (NTDS Serial) - Asynchronous serial data transfer using 10 Mbit/s data rate.
- Type E (NATO Serial) - Asynchronous serial data transfer at 10 Mbit/s, with 300000 words/sec in burst mode, or 175000 words/sec in single transfer mode. Type E is derived from STANAG 4153. Type E uses Bi-Phase Modulation [Manchester II phase encoding]. The impedance is 50 ohms + 5 ohms, a 50 ohm Triaxial cable is defined [center conductor is the signal, the other two are shields]. MIL-C-17/134 cable is used for lengths up to 120 meters, MIL-C-17/135 is used for cable lengths up to 300 meters. The connectors are defined by MIL-C-49142 /01 and /02.
- Type F - MIL-STD-1553 aircraft Manchester Biphase multiplex serial bus, 1 Mbit/s data rate.
- Type G (RS-449 compatible with RS-232) - uses EIA449 / EIA232 implementation.
- Type H (High Speed) - Parallel data transfer of up to 500,000 words per second on one cable.
- Type I - Not specified.
- Type J - Optical version
- Type K (SCSI) - Based on SCSI-2.

== Mechanical ==
Type D uses BNC coaxial connectors. Type E uses TNC triaxial connectors.

== Electrical Signalling ==
- Type A - Binary voltage levels of 0 VDC (logic 1) and -15 VDC (logic 0)
- Type B - Binary voltage levels of 0 VDC (logic 1) and -3 VDC (logic 0)
- Type C - Binary voltage levels of 0 VDC (logic 1) and +3.5 VDC (logic 0)
- Type D - Bipolar +/- 3.25 VDC nominal
- Type E - Bipolar +/- 600mv
- Type F -
- Type G -
- Type H -
- Type I - Not specified.
- Type J -
