= List of military electronics of the United States: M–Z =

This subpage lists American military electronic instruments/systems along with brief descriptions. This list specifically identifies electronic devices which are assigned designations (names) according to the Joint Electronics Type Designation System (JETDS) beginning with the AN/ prefix. They are grouped below by the first designation letter following this prefix. The list is organized as sorted tables that reflect the purpose, uses and manufacturers of each listed item.

The list on this page only shows designations where the first letter after AN/ is between M and Z. For all designations between A and G, please see List of military electronics of the United States: A–G.

NOTE: Letters E, H, I, J, L, N, O, Q, R, X and Y are not used in the first-position of JETDS nomenclatures.

AN/:
- Top
- A–G
- M
- P
- S
- T
- U
- V
- W
- Z
- See also
- References
- Bibliography
- Further reading
- External links
- Main list

== M ==
=== MLx – Mobile Countermeasures Systems ===
AN/MLQ – Mobile Countermeasures Special/Combination Systems
Designation	Purpose/Description	Location/Used By	Manufacturer
AN/MLQ-16	Portable/mobile electronic countermeasure communications jamming system	US Marine Corps	Barker and Williamson
AN/MLQ-24	M37 truck-mounted Countermeasures Receiving Set direction finder used to intercept and analyze enemy radar emissions for ELINT in the frequency range 60 MHz (5.0 m) to 40 GHz (7.5 mm) supporting tactical operations, replaced by AN/MLQ-36	US Army	
AN/MLQ-34	TACJAM self-propelled, 4 kW high-power, tactical VHF radio jamming system operating from 20–200 MHz (15.0–1.5 m), used with AN/TSQ-112, replaced AN/GLQ-3	US Army M1015 tracked cargo carrier	American Electronic Labs (now BAE)
AN/MLQ-36	Mobile Electronic Warfare Support System (MEWSS) capable of receiving signals from 0.03–3 GHz (999.31–9.99 cm), upgraded to AN/MLQ-39.	US Army, US Marine Corps	General Dynamics
AN/MLQ-38	Ground-Based Common Sensor Heavy (GBCS-H) electronic attack, signals intelligence (SIGINT) and emitter targeting system	US Army	
AN/MLQ-40	Prophet mobile ground-based tactical signals intelligence (SIGINT) system, replaces AN/PRD-12, AN/TLQ-17 Trafficjam, AN/TRQ-32 Teammate, and AN/TSQ-138 Trailblazer systems	US Army	General Dynamics, Titan Corp
AN/MLQ-41	Countermeasures detecting system	US Army	

=== MPx – Mobile Radar Systems ===
AN/MPN – Mobile Radar Navigational Aid Systems
Designation	Purpose/Description	Location/Used By	Manufacturer
AN/MPN-1	Mobile ground control 2D S-band search radar (3.0 GHz (10 cm) at 100 kW) and X-band (10.0 GHz (3 cm) at 20 kW) and precision approach radar with a range of 30 mi (48 km) and an operational ceiling of 4,000 ft (1,200 m)		Bendix Corp, ITT-Gilfillan
AN/MPN-2	Mobile 15 watt A-band and 75 watt B-band ground radar beacon, used with AN/CPN-8		Meissner Manufacturing Co
AN/MPN-3	Mobile S/X-band ground control radar with a range of about 30 mi (48 km) up to about 4,000 ft (1,200 m) altitude		Bendix Corp
AN/MPN-5	Mobile ground control combined search and precision approach radar (PAR) operating in S-band search between 2.74–2.9 GHz (10.94–10.34 cm) at 500 kW and X-band PAR between 9–9.18 GHz (3.33–3.27 cm) at 25 kW. Search range was about 50 mi (80 km) while the precision range was about 10 mi (16 km)		Bendix Corp
AN/MPN-8	Mobile ground radar beacon with a power output of 200 and 400 watts		Meissner Manufacturing Co
AN/MPN-11	Mobile 45 kW precision approach radar operating from 9–9.6 GHz (3.33–3.12 cm) and a range of 10 mi (16 km)		ITT-Gilfillan, Raytheon
AN/MPN-13	Mobile precision approach radar operating between 2.7–2.9 GHz (11.10–10.34 cm) at 45 kW and 9–9.16 GHz (3.33–3.27 cm) at 500 kW with a range of just 10 mi (16 km)		ITT-Gilfillan
AN/MPN-14	Mobile ground combined Airport Surveillance Radar (ASR) and Precision Approach Radar (PAR) with a search range out to about 200 nmi (230 mi; 370 km) and PAR at about 15 nmi (17 mi; 28 km)		ITT-Gilfillan
AN/MPN-17	Mobile landing control radar operating between 2.7–2.82 GHz (11.10–10.63 cm) and 3–10 GHz (9.99–3.00 cm)		ITT-Gilfillan
AN/MPN-25	Mobile combined Airport Surveillance Radar (ASR) with a 30 nmi (35 mi; 56 km) range and Precision Approach Radar (PAR) with a 20 nmi (23 mi; 37 km) range		ITT-Gilfillan
AN/MPN-26	Mobile ground control radar	Did not enter service	ITT-Gilfillan
AN/MPN-T1	Shore-based mobile ground control radar variant of AN/SPN-10 automatic landing system		Bell Aircraft

AN/MPQ - Mobile Radar Special/Combination Systems
Designation	Purpose/Description	Location/Used By	Manufacturer
AN/MPQ-2	Close Cooperation Control Unit truck mounted tracking radar/computer/communication system		L.H. Terpening Co
AN/MPQ-3	Counter-battery radar		
AN/MPQ-4	50 kW counter-battery radar (Firefinder) operating in the K_{u}-band at 16 GHz (1.87 cm) with a range of 9.3 mi (15 km), replaced the older AN/MPQ-10, replaced by AN/TPQ-36	US Marine Corps	General Electric
AN/MPQ-10	200 kW S-band counter-battery radar operating at 2.74–2.96 GHz (10.94–10.13 cm) and range of 20,000 yd (11 mi; 18 km), replaced by AN/MPQ-4		Sperry Corp
AN/MPQ-12	250 kW missile tracking radar operating from 2.7–2.9 GHz (11.10–10.34 cm), modified SCR-584 radar	MGM-5 Corporal	Reeves Instrument Corp
AN/MPQ-14	Course Directing Central, replaced AN/TPQ-2, replaced by AN/TPQ-10		General Electric
AN/MPQ-18	600 kW missile tracking radar operating from 2.65–2.95 GHz (11.31–10.16 cm)		Reeves Instrument Corp
AN/MPQ-21	1 megawatt missile tracking radar operating at 6 GHz (5.00 cm)		Sperry Corp
AN/MPQ-25	210 kW fire control radar operating between 2.7–2.9 GHz (11.10–10.34 cm)	MGM-5 Corporal	ITT-Gilfillan
AN/MPQ-33	125 watt High Power Illuminator doppler Radar (HPIR) operating from 10–10.25 GHz (3.00–2.92 cm)	MIM-23 Hawk	Raytheon
AN/MPQ-34	200 watt X-band Continuous Wave Acquisition Radar (CWAR) operating at 10 GHz (3.00 cm)	MIM-23 Hawk	Raytheon
AN/MPQ-35	450 kW high/medium-altitude threat acquisition/detection radar	MIM-23 Hawk	Raytheon
AN/MPQ-37	Range Only Radar (ROR)	MIM-23 Hawk	Raytheon
AN/MPQ-39	High Power Illuminator doppler Radar (HPIR)	MIM-23 Hawk	Raytheon
AN/MPQ-43	Mobile High Power Acquisition Radar (HIPAR) operating between 1.35–1.45 GHz (22.21–20.68 cm)	MIM-14 Nike Hercules	General Electric
AN/MPQ-46	J-band High Power Illuminator doppler Radar (HPIR)	MIM-23 Hawk	
AN/MPQ-48	Continuous Wave Acquisition Radar (CWAR)	MIM-23 Hawk	
AN/MPQ-49	Forward Area Alerting Radar (FAAR) operating in D-band with a range of 12 mi (20 km)	FIM-43 Redeye, M48 Chaparral, M163 Vulcan Air Defense System (VADS)	Sanders Associates, Sperry Corp
AN/MPQ-50	High/medium-altitude C-band threat acquisition/detection radar operating between .5–1 GHz (59.96–29.98 cm) with a maximum range of 65 mi (105 km)	MIM-23 Hawk	
AN/MPQ-51	120 kW K_{u}-band Range Only Radar (ROR) operating between 15.5–17.5 GHz (0.02–0.02 m) with a maximum range of 52 mi (84 km)	MIM-23 Hawk	Raytheon
AN/MPQ-53	100 kW Phased Array Tracking Radar to Intercept on Target (PATRIOT) passive electronically scanned array operating between 4–6 GHz (7.49–5.00 cm) with a range of 37 nmi (43 mi; 69 km)	MIM-104 Patriot	Raytheon
AN/MPQ-55	Continuous Wave Acquisition Radar (CWAR)	MIM-23 Hawk	
AN/MPQ-57	High Power Illuminator doppler Radar (HPIR)	MIM-23 Hawk	
AN/MPQ-61	High Power Illuminator doppler Radar (HPIR)	MIM-23 Hawk	
AN/MPQ-62	Continuous Wave Acquisition Radar (CWAR), replaced by AN/TPS-80 G/ATOR	MIM-23 Hawk	
AN/MPQ-63	30 kW instrumentation radar operating from 9.3–10 GHz (3.22–3.00 cm)		ITT-Gilfillan
AN/MPQ-64	Sentinal X-band passive electronically scanned array 3D radar with a range of 25 mi (40 km) up to an altitude of 13,000 ft (4 km), modification of AN/TPQ-36	US Army	Raytheon Missiles & Defense
AN/MPQ-65	Passive electronically scanned array (PESA) radar	MIM-104 Patriot	

AN/MPS – Mobile Radar Detection/Range and Bearing Search Systems
Designation	Purpose/Description	Location/Used By	Manufacturer
AN/MPS-1	Early-warning radar operating from 1.28–1.35 GHz (23.42–22.21 cm), developed as Project 424C, Camp Evans Signal Laboratory		
AN/MPS-4	140 kW height-finder radar operating from 6.275–6.575 GHz (4.78–4.56 cm) with a range of 80 mi (130 km) and an altitude of 40,000 ft (12,000 m)		Hazeltine Corp
AN/MPS-7	650 kW long range surveillance radar with a range of 325 nmi (374 mi; 602 km) and up to 60,000 ft (18,000 m) operating between 1.22–1.35 GHz (24.57–22.21 cm), mobile version of the AN/FPS-20	Air Defense Command	Bendix Corp
AN/MPS-8	280 kW height-finder radar operating from 9.23–9.404 GHz (3.25–3.19 cm) with a range of 120 nmi (140 mi; 220 km) and an altitude of 60,000 ft (18,000 m)		RCA Corp
AN/MPS-9	650 kW tracking radar operating between 2.7–2.9 GHz (11.10–10.34 cm), used with AN/MSQ-1		Reeves Instrument Corp
AN/MPS-11	1.8 megawatt mobile long range early warning radar operating between 1.28–1.35 GHz (23.42–22.21 cm) with a range of 200 mi (320 km)		General Electric
AN/MPS-14	5 megawatt S-band height-finder radar operating between 2.7–2.9 GHz (11.10–10.34 cm) with a range of 200 nmi (230 mi; 370 km) up to an altitude of 60,000 ft (18,000 m), mobile version of AN/FPS-6	Air Defense Command	General Electric
AN/MPS-36	1 megawatt missile tracking radar	White Sands Missile Range	

=== MRx – Mobile Radio Systems ===
AN/MRC – Mobile Radio Communication Systems
Designation	Purpose/Description	Location/Used By	Manufacturer
AN/MRC-83	Vehicular mounted HF radio, replaced by AN/MRC-138	US Marine Corps	
AN/MRC-87	Radio set	US Marine Corps	
AN/MRC-109	VHF radio	US Marine Corps	
AN/MRC-110	VHF radio	US Marine Corps	
AN/MRC-138	Vehicular mounted Single Side Band (SSB) radio set operating between 2–29.99 MHz (149.90–10.00 m)	US Marine Corps	Harris Corp
AN/MRC-142	Vehicular mounted Digital Wideband Transmission System (DWTS) UHF 3-watt radio terminal set operating from 1.35–1.85 GHz (22.21–16.20 cm)	US Marine Corps	
AN/MRC-145	Vehicular mounted version of AN/VRC-92 Single Channel Ground and Airborne Radio System (SINCGARS) 50-watt VHF radio set operating from 30–87.975 MHz (9.99–3.41 m)	US Marine Corps	Harris Corp

AN/MRN – Mobile Radio Navigational Aid Systems
Designation	Purpose/Description	Location/Used By	Manufacturer
AN/MRN-1	25 watt Instrument approach localizer operating from 108.3–110.3 MHz (2.77–2.72 m), used with RC-103 airborne localizer receiver, same equipment as AN/CRN-3	K-53 van	
AN/MRN-2	Radio Range, used with Signal Corps Radio SCR-522	K-53 van	
AN/MRN-3	Marker beacon, jeep mounted		
AN/MRN-12	Mobile control tower		
AN/MRN-20	Mobile control tower, trailer mounted		

AN/MRQ – Mobile Radio Special/Combination Systems
Designation	Purpose/Description	Location/Used By	Manufacturer
AN/MRQ-7	Doppler radio	MGM-5 Corporal	
AN/MRQ-12	Vehicular mounted Communications Interface System (CIS) providing facilities to operate other comms equipment/systems	US Marine Corps	NSWC Crane

=== MSx – Mobile Special/Combination Systems ===
AN/MSC – Mobile Special/Combination Communication Systems
Designation	Purpose/Description	Location/Used By	Manufacturer
AN/MSC-25	Communications Operations Center	US Army	
AN/MSC-63	Shelterized communications switch	US Marine Corps	
AN/MSC-77	Sensor Mobile Monitoring System (SMMS) receives, stores, processes, displays, and reports VHF/UHF sensor activity	US Marine Corps	

AN/MSG – Mobile Special/Combination Fire Control Systems
Designation	Purpose/Description	Location/Used By	Manufacturer
AN/MSG-4	Mobile air defense system		Sperry Corp
AN/MSG-5	Mobile air defense system		Sperry Corp

AN/MSQ – Mobile Special/Combination Systems
Designation	Purpose/Description	Location/Used By	Manufacturer
AN/MSQ-1	Close Support Control Set radar/computer/communication system, later called MARC (Matador Automatic Radar Control), used with AN/APS-11, AN/APW-11 and AN/MPS-9 radars	B-26 Marauder, MGM-1 Matador, RB-57A Canberra, USS Neosho (AO-143), USS Tarawa (CV-40)	Reeves Instrument Corp
AN/MSQ-13	Interim air defense system		Sperry Corp
AN/MSQ-18	Battalion Missile Operations System for command, control, and coordination in conjunction with AN/MSQ-28	Army Air Defense Command Post Project Nike	Hughes Aircraft, Raytheon
AN/MSQ-28	Directs associated missile batteries (AN/MSQ-18)	Army Air Defense Command Post Project Nike	Raytheon
AN/MSQ-35	X-band Radar Bomb Scoring (RBS) Central, developed into AN/MSQ-77	1st Combat Evaluation Group RBS Express trains	Raytheon, Reeves Instrument Corp
AN/MSQ-39	Radar Bomb Scoring (RBS) Central, replaced by AN/MSQ-46	1st Combat Evaluation Group RBS Express trains	Reeves Instrument Corp
AN/MSQ-46	Radar Bomb Scoring (RBS) Central, replaced AN/MSQ-39		
AN/MSQ-51	Aerial Target Control Central (ATCC) radar/computer/communications system		Reeves Instrument Corp
AN/MSQ-77	Combat Skyspot/Combat Proof, nicknamed Miscue 77, mobile automatic tracking radar (200 mi (320 km) range) and computer system for command guidance of aircraft during ground directed bombing (GDB), replaced by AN/TPQ-43 Seek Score radar system		Reeves Instrument Corp
AN/MSQ-104	Engagement Control Station (ECS)	MIM-104 Patriot	Lockheed Martin, Raytheon
AN/MSQ-115	Vehicular mounted command communication system	US Marine Corps	Rockwell Collins
AN/MSQ-124	Air Defense Communications Platform (ADCP) vehicular mounted radio and computer equipment, interfaces with AN/TYQ-23 Tactical Air Operations Module (TAOM)	US Marine Corps	
AN/MSQ-132	Engagement Control Station (ECS)	MIM-104 Patriot	
AN/MSQ-134	Tactical Exploitation Group-Main (TEG-M)	US Marine Corps	

AN/MSR – Mobile Special/Combination Receiving/Passive Detection Systems
Designation	Purpose/Description	Location/Used By	Manufacturer
AN/MSR-3	TACJAM-A 1,082 lb (491 kg) mobile tactical HF through SHF communications intelligence (COMINT) receiver and direction finder, and 1.6 kW HF/VHF electronic countermeasures system	EH-60L Black Hawk	Sanders/Tracor (Joint venture)
AN/MSR-T4	Threat Reaction Analysis Indicator System (TRAINS) radar receiver/data processing system, slave to AN/MST-T1		

AN/MST – Mobile Special/Combination Transmitter Systems
Designation	Purpose/Description	Location/Used By	Manufacturer
AN/MST-T1	Multiple Threat Emitter Simulator (MUTES), (Note: Many different sources say a smaller follow-on system, AN/MST-T1(V), is called "Mini-MUTES") master to AN/MSR-T4		General Dynamics, US Dynamics

=== MYx – Mobile Data Processing/Computer Systems ===
AN/MYQ – Mobile Data Processing/Computer Special/Combination Systems
Designation	Purpose/Description	Location/Used By	Manufacturer
AN/MYQ-7	Shelterized, mobile Marine Expeditionary Force-Intelligence Analysis System (MEF-IAS) providing intelligence analysis support	US Marine Corps	
AN/MYQ-8	Vehicular mounted Technical Control and Analysis Center-Product Improvement Program (TCAC-PIP) signals intelligence (SIGINT) and electronic warfare (EW) fusion center, replaced the AN/TSQ-130	US Marine Corps	
AN/MYQ-9	Technical Control and Analysis Center (TCAC) transportable workstation for signals intelligence (SIGINT) processing	US Marine Corps	

AN/:
- Top
- A–G
- M
- P
- S
- T
- U
- V
- W
- Z
- See also
- References
- Bibliography
- Further reading
- External links
- Main list

== P ==
=== PAx – Portable Infrared Systems ===
AN/PAQ – Portable Infrared Special/Combination Systems
Designation	Purpose/Description	Location/Used By	Manufacturer
AN/PAQ-1	16 lb (7.3 kg) tripod or shoulder mounted Laser Target Designator (LTD) near infrared target designator/rangefinder, operates at 1064 nms		Hughes Aircraft
AN/PAQ-3	Man-portable tripod mounted or shoulder fixed Modular Universal Laser Equipment (MULE) target designator/rangefinder with an effective range of 3,300 yd (3,000 m) for moving targets and 5,500 yd (5,000 m) for stationary targets		Hughes Aircraft
AN/PAQ-4	Small-arms mounted Infrared (IR) Aiming Laser (IAL) with a range of 1,100 yd (1,000 m) at an operating wavelength of 830 nms		Insight Technology

AN/PAS – Portable Infrared Detection/Range and Bearing Search Systems
Designation	Purpose/Description	Location/Used By	Manufacturer
AN/PAS-4	Passive night vision sight, required an outside source of invisible infrared light to illuminate the viewing area	M14 rifle	
AN/PAS-5	Face mounted Infrared (IR) binocular used with auxiliary infrared radiation source, enabling the user to operate a vehicle during night hours		
AN/PAS-6	Metascope night vision goggles		Varo
AN/PAS-7	Handheld thermal viewer, replaced by AN/PVS-13		Night Vision Laboratories
AN/PAS-8	Aiming Light, developmental prototype		
AN/PAS-10	Infrared (IR) camera for use in detecting roof moisture		Magnavox
AN/PAS-13	Infrared day or night Thermal Weapon Sight (TWS)	GAU-21, M2 machine gun, M4 carbine, M16 rifle, M24 SWS, M60 and M240 machine guns, Mk 19 and Mk 47 Striker grenade launchers	Raytheon
AN/PAS-17	Thermal Weapon Sight (TWS), to replace the AN/PVS-4		
AN/PAS-18	Receiver, Infrared (IR) System night sight	FIM-92 Stinger	
AN/PAS-19	Handheld thermal imager		
AN/PAS-20	Hand Held Thermal Imager (HHTI)		Hughes Aircraft
AN/PAS-21	Thermal sight (Forward Looking Infrared (FLIR) SeeSPOT III) used either with laser target designator or standalone		Teledyne FLIR
AN/PAS-22	Long Range Thermal Imager (LRTI) used in conjunction with laser target designator		Elbit Systems
AN/PAS-23	Mini Thermal Monocular (MTM) with Infrared (IR) laser		L3Harris
AN/PAS-24	ObservIR Recon III Thermal Imager with laser rangefinder		Teledyne FLIR
AN/PAS-25	Thermal Laser Spot Imager (TLSI) with "SeeSPOT" capability for aiding with target designation		Elbit Systems
AN/PAS-26	Thermal imager with laser rangefinder (Forward Looking Infrared (FLIR) Recon III Lite)		Teledyne FLIR
AN/PAS-27	Individual Weapon Night Sight-Thermal (IWNS-T)		
AN/PAS-28	Medium Range Thermal Bi-Ocular (MRTB) sight (PhantomIRxr)		Raytheon
AN/PAS-30	Mini Thermal Imager (MTI) uncooled monocular handheld unit		L3Harris
AN/PAS-31	Integrated Night Observation Device—Long Range Thermal (INOD-LRT) clip-on night vision sniper scope		Knight's Armament
AN/PAS-35	Family of Weapon Sights-Individual (FWS-I) thermal weapon sight, pairs with ENVG and ENVG-B		Leonardo DRS
AN/PAS-36	Family of Weapon Sights-Individual (FWS-I) thermal weapon sight, pairs with ENVG and ENVG-B		BAE

=== PEx – Portable Laser Systems ===
AN/PED – Portable Laser Direction Finding/Reconnaissance/Surveillance Systems
Designation	Purpose/Description	Location/Used By	Manufacturer
AN/PED-1	Lightweight Laser Designator Rangefinder (LLDR) tripod-mounted laser designator		Northrop Grumman
AN/PED-5	Target Reconnaissance Infrared (IR) Geolocating Range Finder—Laser Target Locator Module (TRIGR LTLM) tripod-mounted laser designator		BAE
AN/PED-6	Joint Effects Targeting System—Target Location Designation System (JETS TLDS) tripod-mounted laser designator		Leonardo DRS

AN/PEQ – Portable Laser Special/Combination Systems
Designation	Purpose/Description	Location/Used By	Manufacturer
AN/PEQ-1	17.8 lb (8.1 kg) battery operated Special Operations Forces Laser Acquisition Marker (SOFLAM) tripod-mounted laser designator with a range of more than 3.1 mi (5 km), used with AN/PVS-13	CCTs, FORECON, JTACs, TACPs	Northrop Grumman
AN/PEQ-2	Infrared (IR) Target Pointer/Illuminator/Aiming Laser (ITPIAL) weapon-mounted infrared laser sight		Insight Technology
AN/PEQ-3	Combined laser, Infrared (IR) pointer, and illuminator	Sikorsky H-60	
AN/PEQ-4	Medium Power Laser Illuminator (MPLI) handheld target laser designator		Insight Technology
AN/PEQ-5	Carbine Visible Laser (CVL)		Insight Technology
AN/PEQ-6	Integrated Laser Light Module (ILLM) for Heckler & Koch Mark 23 pistol	United States Special Operations Command (USSOCOM)	Insight Technology
AN/PEQ-7	Multi-Aiming Device (MAD) for mounting on weapon or standalone on MAD Powergrip.		Wilcox Industries
AN/PEQ-9	Laser Designator Module (LDM)		Northrop Grumman
AN/PEQ-10	Laser Aiming Module (LAM 1000) for pistols		L3 Technologies
AN/PEQ-11	Dual Infrared (IR) Aiming Laser (DIAL 100G) crew-served multi-function aiming laser, often mounted to crew-served weapons	United States Naval Special Warfare Command (NAVSPECWAR)	BE Meyers
AN/PEQ-13	Common Laser Range Finder (CLRF) binocular system		Elbit Systems
AN/PEQ-14	Integrated Laser White Light Pointer (ILWLP) mounted on pistols		Insight Technology
AN/PEQ-15	Advanced Target Pointer/Illuminator/Aiming Light (ATPIAL) weapon-mounted Infrared (IR) Laser sight		Insight Technology, L3Harris
AN/PEQ-16	Integrated Pointing Illumination Module (IPIM) weapon-mounted Infrared (IR) laser sight and visible flashlight		Insight Technology, L3Harris
AN/PEQ-17	Portable Lightweight Designator/Rangefinder (PLDR) tripod mounted long-range laser designator		Elbit Systems
AN/PEQ-18	Infrared (IR) Zoom Laser Illuminator Designator (IZLID 1000P) weapon-mountable infrared laser target designator and illuminator		BE Meyers
AN/PEQ-19	Joint Terminal Attack Controller Laser Target Designator (JTAC LTD) tripod mounted laser designator		Elbit Systems

=== PPx – Portable Radar Systems ===
AN/PPQ – Portable Radar Special/Combination Systems
Designation	Purpose/Description	Location/Used By	Manufacturer
AN/PPQ-1	Man-portable personnel detection radar used during night/low visibility patrols, forerunner of AN/PVQ-2		
AN/PPQ-2	1 kW vehicle-mounted Light/Special Division Interim Sensor (LSDIS) L-band air defense early-warning radar operating from 1.22–1.46 GHz (24.6–20.5 cm) with a range of 12 mi (10 nmi; 19 km)	US Army	Lockheed Martin

AN/PPS – Portable Radar Detection/Range and Bearing Search Systems
Designation	Purpose/Description	Location/Used By	Manufacturer
AN/PPS-1	Continuous wave (CW) Doppler radar portable ground surveillance radar		Sperry Gyroscope
AN/PPS-4	Silent Sentry 800 watt battery operated tripod mounted 4 ft (1.2 m) tall I-band portable perimeter surveillance radar operating from 8.9–9.4 GHz (3.4–3.2 cm) with a range of 0.93 mi (1.50 km) tracking personnel and 5 mi (8.0 km) for vehicles, replaced by AN/PPS-5		Sperry Corp
AN/PPS-5	1 kW lightweight 125 lb (57 kg) battery operated portable K_{u}-band pulse-Doppler perimeter surveillance radar operating between 16–16.5 GHz (1.87–1.82 cm) with a range of 3.7 mi (6 km) for detecting personnel movement and 12 mi (20 km) for vehicles, replaced AN/PPS-4		Telephonics
AN/PPS-6	100 watt portable I-band pulse Doppler perimeter surveillance radar operating at 9–9.5 GHz (3.33–3.16 cm) with a 1.9 mi (3 km) range, replaced by AN/PPS-15	US Marine Corps	General Instruments
AN/PPS-9	13 lb (5.9 kg) I-band CW perimeter surveillance radar with battlefield Identification Friend or Foe (IFF) capability and a range of 9.3 mi (15.0 km)		RCA Corp
AN/PPS-10	Portable ground surveillance radar with battlefield Identification Friend or Foe (IFF) capability operating at 10 GHz (3.0 cm), also known as GD Model 205		General Dynamics
AN/PPS-14	18 lb (8.2 kg) Listening Post Surveillance Device (LPSD) 10 mW L-band pulse Doppler perimeter surveillance radar operating at 1.25 GHz (24.0 cm) with a range of 430 ft (130 m)		Aerospace Research
AN/PPS-15	94 mW lightweight battery operated solid-state X-band FM CW perimeter surveillance radar operating from 10.197–10.403 GHz (2.940–2.882 cm) with a 4,900 ft (1,500 m) range for personnel detection and vehicles up to 19,600 ft (6,000 m), replaced AN/PPS-6	US Marine Corps	BAE, General Dynamics

=== PRx – Portable Radio Systems ===
AN/PRC – Portable Radio Communications Systems
Designation	Purpose/Description	Location/Used By	Manufacturer
AN/PRC-5	16 watt shortwave radio transmitting from 4–16 MHz (74.95–18.74 m) depending on the crystals installed and receiving between 4.5–16 MHz (67–19 m)	US Army	
AN/PRC-6	Walkie-talkie handheld 250 mW VHF FM two-way radio operating from 47–55.4 MHz (6.38–5.41 m) and a range of about 1 mi (1.6 km), replaced SCR-536		Raytheon
AN/PRC-8	0.9 watt portable 26 lb (12 kg) HF radio transceiver operating from 20–27.9 MHz (14.99–10.75 m), replaced by AN/PRC-25		
AN/PRC-9	0.9 watt portable 26 lb (12 kg) HF/VHF radio transceiver operating from 27–38.9 MHz (11.10–7.71 m), replaced by AN/PRC-25		
AN/PRC-10	0.9 watt portable 26 lb (12 kg) VHF FM superheterodyne radio transceiver operating from 38–54.9 MHz (7.89–5.46 m), replaced by AN/PRC-25		
AN/PRC-17	Portable VHF/UHF AM survival radio		
AN/PRC-25	2 watt VHF FM solid-state radio transceiver operating from 30–75.95 MHz (9.99–3.95 m) over 920 channels with a range of 9 mi (14 km), replaced the AN/PRC-10, replaced by AN/PRC-77		Electrospace Corp
AN/PRC-32	Portable UHF AM survival radio operating at 243 MHz (1.23 m)	US Navy	
AN/PRC-47	Portable 75 lb (34 kg) HF 100 watt AM/CW/USB/RTTY radio operating from 2–12 MHz (149.90–24.98 m), replaced by AN/PRC-104 and AN/PRC-105	US Marine Corps	Collins Radio
AN/PRC-49	Portable UHF survival radio		
AN/PRC-63	Portable UHF AM beacon survival radio		GTE
AN/PRC-65	Portable man-pack VHF AM transceiver with 1,122 channels, operating between 100–156 MHz (3.00–1.92 m)		Simmonds Precision Products
AN/PRC-66	Portable VHF/UHF AM transceiver with 3,500 channels, operating between 225–400 MHz (1.33–0.75 m)	US Air Force	Collins Radio
AN/PRC-68	Handheld VHF FM transceiver	US Marine Corps	
AN/PRC-74	Portable HF SSB radio operating from 2–12 MHz (149.90–24.98 m)		Hughes Aircraft
AN/PRC-75	Portable VHF/UHF AM transceiver	US Marine Corps	Collins Radio
AN/PRC-77	Portable VHF combat-net radio with 5 mi (8.0 km) estimated range, replaced by Single Channel Ground and Airborne Radio System (SINCGARS) family of radios, replaced AN/PRC-25	US Marine Corps	Associated Industries
AN/PRC-90	Survival radio operating at 243–282.8 MHz (1.23–1.06 m) AM with beacon mode, and a tone generator to allow the sending of Morse Code. Replaced by AN/PRC-149		
AN/PRC-103	Rescue swimmer UHF AM transceiver radio		
AN/PRC-104	Tactical manpack 20 watt HF SSB/CW transceiver radio operating between 2–29.99 MHz (149.90–10.00 m), replaced AN/PRC-47, replaced by AN/PRC-150	US Marine Corps	Hughes Aircraft
AN/PRC-105	Tactical manpack 20 watt HF SSB/CW transceiver radio operating between 2–29.99 MHz (149.90–10.00 m), replaced AN/PRC-47,	US Marine Corps	
AN/PRC-112	Survival radio operating in VHF/UHF bands, replaced by AN/PRC-149		
AN/PRC-113	Tactical short-range manpack VHF (116–149.975 MHz (2.58–2.00 m)) or UHF (225–399.975 MHz (1.33–0.75 m)) AM combat-net radio transceiver		Magnavox, Raytheon
AN/PRC-117	Falcon tactical manpack multi-band VHF/UHF software-defined combat-net radio	US Marine Corps	Harris Corp
AN/PRC-118	400 kBd Low-Cost Packet Radio (LCPR) wideband datalink using direct sequence pseudonoise (DSPN) frequency-hopping spread spectrum	EH-60A Black Hawk	L3Harris
AN/PRC-119	Lightweight tactical VHF (30–87.975 MHz (9.99–3.41 m)) Single Channel Ground and Airborne Radio System (SINCGARS)		CECOM
AN/PRC-125	Rescue swimmer radio, replaced by AN/PRC-149		
AN/PRC-127	Portable handheld 2 watt 136–160 MHz (2.20–1.87 m) Very High Frequency (VHF) radio		Honeywell
AN/PRC-138	Lightweight manpack 125-watt HF/VHF (1.6–60 MHz (187.37–5.00 m)) radio set	US Marine Corps	Harris Corp
AN/PRC-148	Handheld Multiband Inter/Intra Team Radio (MBITR) and Joint Tactical Radio System operating in VHF/UHF range from 30–512 MHz (9.99–0.59 m)	US Army, US Marine Corps	Thales Group
AN/PRC-149	Rescue radio for non-combat use, replaces the PRC-90, PRC-112 and PRC-125		Tadiran
AN/PRC-150	Falcon II tactical HF SSB/VHF FM manpack radio	US Marine Corps	Harris Corp
AN/PRC-152	Falcon III portable, compact, tactical software-defined combat-net radio		Harris Corp
AN/PRC-153	Integrated, Intra-Squad Radio (IISR) encrypted/secure two-way radio	US Marine Corps	Motorola
AN/PRC-154	Rifleman Radio is a handheld, intra-squad UHF tactical radio	US Army	Thales Group, General Dynamics
AN/PRC-155	Joint Tactical Radio System (JTRS) Handheld, Manpack & Small Form Fit (HMS)		General Dynamics
AN/PRC-158	Falcon IV Multi-channel Manpack (MCMP) radio		Harris Corp
AN/PRC-159	Falcon III wideband team radio		Harris Corp
AN/PRC-160	Manpack tactical wideband HF/VHF radio, replaced AN/PRC-150		L3Harris
AN/PRC-161	Battlefield Awareness and Targeting System - Dismounted (BATS-D)		Viasat, L3Harris
AN/PRC-162	Two-channel dismounted ground networking radio, with RT-2048(C)/U		Collins Radio
AN/PRC-163	Dual-channel tactical handheld radio, replaced AN/PRC-152		L3Harris
AN/PRC-165	Handheld Video Data Link (HH-VDL)		L3Harris
AN/PRC-170	Javelin Mobile Ad-hoc Networking (MANET) handheld radio		Thales Group
AN/PRC-171	Falcon IV 3.2 watt 1 lb (0.45 kg) UHF single-channel compact team radio operating from 0.225–2.6 GHz (133.24–11.53 cm)	US Army's Integrated Tactical Network	L3Harris
AN/PRC-343	50 mW short range Integrated/Intra-Squad Radio (IISR), also called Personal Role Radio (PRR), operating from 2.4–2.483 GHz (12.49–12.07 cm) for a distance of 1,600 ft (490 m)	US Marine Corps	Thales
AN/PRC-6809	Multiband Inter/Intra Team Radio (MBITR) Clear handheld radio, without encryption, variation of AN/PRC-148		Thales Group

AN/PRD – Portable Radio Direction Finding/Reconnaissance/Surveillance Systems
Designation	Purpose/Description	Location/Used By	Manufacturer
AN/PRD-10	Man-transportable Radio Direction Finding System (MRDFS) operating from 20–500 MHz (15.0–0.6 m), but direction finding only from 20–80 MHz (15.0–3.7 m)		
AN/PRD-12	Tactical portable HF/VHF/UHF direction finding system, replaced by AN/MLQ-40	US Marine Corps	
AN/PRD-13	HF/VHF/UHF direction finding signals intelligence (SIGINT) Manpack System (SSMS)	Special Operations Forces	Linkabit

AN/PRQ – Portable Radio Special/Combination Systems
Designation	Purpose/Description	Location/Used By	Manufacturer
AN/PRQ-7	Combat Survivor/Evader Locator (CSEL) with GPS, UHF line of sight and satellite communications along with a Cospas-Sarsat beacon		Boeing

=== PSx – Portable Special/Combination Systems ===
AN/PSC – Portable Special/Combination Communications Systems
Designation	Purpose/Description	Location/Used By	Manufacturer
AN/PSC-5	Manpack satellite communications (SATCOM) radio terminal operating in 30–512 MHz (9.99–0.59 m) frequency range	US Marine Corps	Raytheon
AN/PSC-13	Dismounted-Data Automated Communications Terminal (D-DACT) for situational awareness and Command and Control	US Marine Corps	Talla-Tech

AN/PSG – Portable Special/Combination Fire Control Systems
Designation	Purpose/Description	Location/Used By	Manufacturer
AN/PSG-2	Digital Message Device (DMD), remote device used with AN/GSG-10 TACFIRE system		
AN/PSG-10	Pocket Sized Forward Entry Device (PFED) computer for processing fire support specific functions	US Marine Corps	Talla-Tech

AN/PSN – Portable Special/Combination Navigational Aids Systems
Designation	Purpose/Description	Location/Used By	Manufacturer
AN/PSN-4	Long Range Navigation (LORAN) manpack receiver for Army helicopters' avionics		Teledyne
AN/PSN-11	Less than 3 lb (1.4 kg) ruggedized single-frequency Precision Lightweight GPS Receiver (PLGR or Plugger) handheld satellite signals navigation set, replaced by AN/PSN-13	US Marine Corps	Rockwell Collins
AN/PSN-13	Defense Advanced GPS Receiver (DAGR, or Dagger)	US Marine Corps	Rockwell Collins

AN/PSQ – Portable Special/Combination Systems
Designation	Purpose/Description	Location/Used By	Manufacturer
AN/PSQ-4	23 lb (10 kg) portable battery operated radio	US Army	Raytheon
AN/PSQ-9	1,317 lb (597 kg) HF/VHF/UHF Team Portable Collection System Multi-Platform Capable (TPCS-MPC) system for gathering communications/signals intelligence (COMINT/SIGINT)	US Marine Corps	SPAWAR
AN/PSQ-13	142 lb (64 kg) Secondary Imagery Dissemination System (SIDS) portable electronic device to share tactical digital imagery	US Marine Corps	
AN/PSQ-14	Grenade Launcher Day/Night Sight Mounts (GLDNSM)	US Army, US Marine Corps	
AN/PSQ-16	Hand Held Monitor (HHM) radio receiver which connects to a laptop	Remotely Monitored Battlefield Sensor System-II (REMBASS II)	L3Harris
AN/PSQ-17	Communication Planning System (CPS) Laptop computer provides communications and management of Military Strategic and Tactical Relay (MILSTAR) Extremely High Frequency (EHF) satellite resources		
AN/PSQ-18	Grenade Launcher Day/Night Sight Mounts (GLDNSM), an enhanced fire-control system	M203 grenade launcher	Insight Technology
AN/PSQ-19	Target Location, Designation, and Hand-off System (TLDHS) portable equipment suite allowing operators to determine their location and designate enemy locations	US Marine Corps	Talla-Tech, Walkabout Computers
AN/PSQ-20	Passive monocular Enhanced Night Vision Goggle (ENVG)		Exelis
AN/PSQ-21	Day/night imager hand-held passive thermal infrared (IR) electro-optical sensor used to classify/identify active targets	US Marine Corps	Nova Engineering
AN/PSQ-22	Hand-Held Programmer-Monitor (HHPM) VHF radio receiver that receives, demodulates, decodes, and displays symbols representative of sensor set message transmissions. Used to program sensor units and collect remote sensor data	US Marine Corps	Nova Engineering
AN/PSQ-23	Small Tactical Optical Rifle-Mounted (STORM) laser rangefinder, ballistic calculator with visible and Infrared (IR) lasers		L3Harris
AN/PSQ-25	Enhanced Position Location Reporting System Network Manager (EPLRS-ENM) ruggedized laptop for tracking troop movements	US Marine Corps	
AN/PSQ-27	Data distribution system master case, associated with AN/PSQ-9	US Marine Corps	
AN/PSQ-28	Direction finder set, associated with AN/PSQ-9	US Marine Corps	
AN/PSQ-29	Data distribution system modular case, associated with AN/PSQ-9	US Marine Corps	
AN/PSQ-30	Data distribution system advanced case, associated with AN/PSQ-9	US Marine Corps	
AN/PSQ-36	Portable 580 grams (20 oz) helmet mounted battery operated binocular Fusion Goggle Enhanced (FGE) night vision detection, observation, and target identification system with a 17 μm thermal imaging sensor	US Army	L3Harris
AN/PSQ-39	Monocular Enhanced Night Vision Goggle (ENVG) system		
AN/PSQ-40	Enhanced Night Vision Goggle (ENVG) system		
AN/PSQ-42	Less than 2.5 lb (1.1 kg) third-generation battery operated passive Enhanced Night Vision Goggle-Binocular (ENVG-B)	US Army, US Marine Corps	L3Harris, Elbit Systems of America
AN/PSQ-44	Less than 40 ounces (1,100 g) Enhanced Night Vision Goggle-Binocular (ENVG-B) with 1× magnification		Elbit Systems of America

AN/PSS – Portable Special/Combination Search Systems
Designation	Purpose/Description	Location/Used By	Manufacturer
AN/PSS-11	Battery powered portable land mine detection set weighing 30–36 lb (14–16 kg) depending on manufacturer	US Army	Polan, Oregon Technical Products, The VP Company, Fourdee
AN/PSS-12	Commercial off-the-shelf (COTS) metal detector	US Army	Schiebel
AN/PSS-14	10.2 lb (4.6 kg) battery operated handheld standoff mine detection system (HSTAMIDS) with wideband coherent stepped frequency ground-penetrating radar for detecting both metallic and non-metallic threats including buried wires	US Army, US Marine Corps	L-3 Communications

=== PVx – Portable Visual/Visible Light Systems ===
AN/PVQ – Portable Visual/Visible Light Special/Combination Systems
Designation	Purpose/Description	Location/Used By	Manufacturer
AN/PVQ-2	Sensory Aid Device meant for nighttime/low visibility use for soldiers on patrol sending out pulses of light reflecting them off of objects giving the user an auditory cue, developed from AN/PPQ-1		RCA Corp
AN/PVQ-31	Advanced Combat Optical Gunsight (ACOG)	US Marine Corps, US Army	Trijicon

AN/PVS – Portable Visual/Visible Light Detecting/Range and Bearing Search Systems
Designation	Purpose/Description	Location/Used By	Manufacturer
AN/PVS-1	Starlight Scope first-generation night vision sight	M14 rifle	
AN/PVS-2	First-generation portable battery powered passive electro-optical night vision sight for individual served weapons	M14, M14A2, XM16E1 rifles, M67 recoilless rifle	
AN/PVS-3	3 lb (1.4 kg) handheld miniaturized second-generation battery powered passive electro-optical night vision sight which amplifies reflected ambient light		
AN/PVS-4	4 lb (1.8 kg) second-generation individual served weapon passive battery operated electro-optical night vision sight, replaced AN/PVS-2, replaced by AN/PVS-13	M14 and M16 rifles, M60 machine gun, M67 recoilless rifle, M72A1 LAW rocket launcher, M79 and M203 grenade launchers, M249 SAW	Optic Electronic Corp
AN/PVS-5	Passive dual-tube lightweight 1.98 lb (0.90 kg) night-vision goggles used for aviation and ground support, replaced by AN/PVS-7	US Army, US Marine Corps	ITT, Litton Industries
AN/PVS-6	Man-portable 3.5 lb (1.6 kg) binocular Mini Eyesafe Laser Infrared (IR) Observation Set (MELIOS) laser target designator with ranges out to 6.2 mi (10 km), operating at a wavelength of 1.54 microns, replaced AN/GVS-5		Litton Industries
AN/PVS-7	1.5 lb (0.68 kg) single tube biocular night vision device, replaced AN/PVS-5, replaced by AN/PVS-14	US Army, US Marine Corps	ITT, Litton Industries
AN/PVS-8	Portable shipboard-mounted battery operated long range passive surveillance night vision sight with a 6.2x magnification factor	US Navy	
AN/PVS-9	Front mounted battery powered night vision sniperscope		Simrad Optronics
AN/PVS-10	Third-generation lightweight 4.9 lb (2.2 kg) battery operated Sniper Night Sight (SNS) with 8.5x magnification with target recognition night 660 yd (600 m) and day 870 yd (800 m)	M24 sniper rifle, M110 Semi-Automatic Sniper System	Litton Industries
AN/PVS-11	Handheld submersable monocular short-range passive/active pocketscope, illuminating a mansized object in active mode at a distance of 98 ft (30 m)		Litton Industries
AN/PVS-12	Aquila third-generation 3.8 lb (1.7 kg) battery operated night vision sight with 4x magnification		L3 Technologies
AN/PVS-13	4.2 lb (1.9 kg) 6x magnification battery operated Laser Marker Night Vision Sight (LMNVS) used only with AN/PEQ-1A SOFLAM, replaced AN/PVS-4, AN/TVS-5 and AN/PAS-7		L3 Technologies
AN/PVS-14	14 oz (400 g) third-generation battery operated Monocular Night Vision Device (MNVD) with a range of 490 ft (150 m) Starlight mode and 980 ft (300 m) in moonlight		Elbit Systems, Northrop Grumman
AN/PVS-15	Third-generation handheld or helmet mounted light weight binocular night vision sight submersible to 66 ft (20 m)		L3 Technologies
AN/PVS-16	Maritime multi-sensor gyro-stabilized binoculars		
AN/PVS-17	Third-generation Miniature Night Sight (MNS)	M249 SAW, M240 machine gun	L3 Technologies
AN/PVS-18	Handheld or helmet mounted battery operated monocular night vision sight		L3 Technologies
AN/PVS-20	Night vision sight for crew-served weapons		L3 Technologies
AN/PVS-21	Low profile ruggedized Night Vision Goggles (NVG)		Steiner-Optik
AN/PVS-22	Third-generation 1.75 lb (0.79 kg) battery operated Universal Night Sight (UNS)^{®} clip-on night vision sight submersible up to 66 ft (20 m)		Knight's Armament, Teledyne FLIR
AN/PVS-23	Third-generation ruggedized battery operated multi-purpose 23 oz (650 g) binocular Night Vision Goggles with a focal range from 16 in (410 mm) to infinity		Harris Corp
AN/PVS-24	Third-generation battery operated ruggedized Clip-on Night Vision Device-Image Intensified (CNVD-I^{2}) weighing less than 28.0 oz (794 g) with a minimum focal distance of 82 ft (25 m) and a detection range of 1,600 ft (500 m)		L3Harris
AN/PVS-25	Wide Field of view Diverging Image Tube Night Vision Goggles (WFoV DIT NVG)		L3Harris
AN/PVS-26	Day optic and in-line forward mounted image intensified (I^{2}) night vision device	M24 SWS, M110 SASS	Knight's Armament
AN/PVS-27	Magnum Universal Night Sight (MUNS), also called Scout Sniper Medium Range Night Sight (SSMRNS), detects man-sized target at 5,680 ft (1,730 m)	US Marine Corps	Teledyne FLIR
AN/PVS-29	Battery operated 3.5 lb (1.6 kg) Sniper Night Sight (SNS) with a range of 660 yd (600 m) for human-sized targets	M110 SASS	Knight's Armament
AN/PVS-30	2.9 lb (1.3 kg) third-generation battery operated Universal Night Sight Long Range (UNS LR) Clip-On Night Vision Device (CNVD) weapon sight with typical magnification of 15x identifying human-sized targets at more than 1,100 yd (1 km) and vehicles at 1,600 yd (1.5 km)	M110 SASS	Knight's Armament
AN/PVS-31	Light-weight less than 16 oz (450 g) battery operated helmet-mounted third-generation Binocular Night Vision Device (BNVD) submersible to 66 ft (20 m)	US Air Force	Elbit Systems, L3Harris

=== PYx – Portable Data Processing/Computer Systems ===
AN/PYQ – Portable Data Processing/Computer Special/Combination Systems
Designation	Purpose/Description	Location/Used By	Manufacturer
AN/PYQ-1	Digital Terrain Analysis Mapping System (DTAMS)	US Marine Corps	
AN/PYQ-10	Ruggedized, portable, hand-held Simple Key Loader (SKL) fill device for securely receiving, storing, and transferring data between compatible cryptographic and communications equipment		Sierra Nevada Corp

AN/:
- Top
- A–G
- M
- P
- S
- T
- U
- V
- W
- Z
- See also
- References
- Bibliography
- Further reading
- External links
- Main list

== S ==
=== SAx – Water (surface ship or buoys) Infrared Systems ===
AN/SAR – Water (surface ship or buoys) Infrared Receiver Systems
Designation	Purpose/Description	Location/Used By	Manufacturer
AN/SAR-8	Infrared search and track system for surface ship anti-ship missile defense	US Navy	Spar Aerospace, General Electric Aerospace

=== SEx – Water (surface ship or buoys) Laser Systems ===
AN/SEQ – Water (surface ship or buoys) Laser Special/Combination Systems
Designation	Purpose/Description	Location/Used By	Manufacturer
AN/SEQ-3	Laser Weapon System (LaWS), replaced by High Energy Laser with Integrated Optical-dazzler and Surveillance (HELIOS)	USS Ponce (LPD-15), USS Portland (LPD-27)	NSWC Dahlgren

=== SLx – Water (surface ship or buoys) Countermeasures Systems ===
AN/SLQ – Water Countermeasures Special/Combination Systems
Designation	Purpose/Description	Location/Used By	Manufacturer
AN/SLQ-17	Shipboard computer-controlled warning and jamming false target generator electronic countermeasures system defending against missile/radar threats, includes AN/WLR-8	US Navy Aircraft Carriers	
AN/SLQ-19	Transportable electronic countermeasure system	USS Albany (CG-10), USS Hanson (DDR-832)	RCA Corp
AN/SLQ-25	Nixie 1,570 lb (710 kg) digitally controlled modular electro-acoustic projector towed passive torpedo decoy system	US Navy	Argon ST, Ultra Electronics
AN/SLQ-26	Threat Reactive Anti-Ship Missile Defence Electronic Warfare (EW) countermeasures suite	Albany-class cruisers, Belknap-class cruisers, Charles F. Adams-class destroyers, Knox-class frigates	
AN/SLQ-32	5,000 lb (2,300 kg) shipborne electronic warfare (EW) suite for warning, identification, and bearing of radar-guided anti-ship cruise missiles (ASCM) and their launch platforms receiving from 0.25–20 GHz (119.9–1.5 cm) launching decoys and electronic attack noise/deception jamming countermeasures from 5–20 GHz (6.0–1.5 cm) while tracking multiple emitters	US Navy	Raytheon
AN/SLQ-48	Remotely operated mine neutralization vehicle (MNV) utilizing a tethered submersible vehicle equipped with sonar and a CCD-TV camera for low visibility conditions operating up to 1,000 yards (910 m) and 2,000 ft (610 m) deep	Avenger-class mine countermeasures ships, Osprey-class minehunters	Alliant Techsystems
AN/SLQ-49	Rubber Duck chaff-dispensing buoy decoy system consists of 2 inflatable decoy floats connected by a 16 ft (5 m) cable, replaced by IDS300 inflatable decoy system	US Navy	
AN/SLQ-59	Shipborne electronic attack system	Arleigh Burke-class destroyers, Nimitz-class aircraft carriers, Ticonderoga-class cruisers	L3Harris
AN/SLQ-60	SeaFox 95 lb (43 kg) semi-autonomous, battery-powered fiber-optic guided mine neutralization unmanned underwater vehicle (UUV) about 4 ft (1.2 m) long and 1 ft (30 cm) wide with four independent reversible motors and a hover thruster	Avenger-class mine countermeasures ships, MH-53E Sea Dragon	Atlas North America

AN/SLR – Water Countermeasures Receiver/Passive Detection Systems
Designation	Purpose/Description	Location/Used By	Manufacturer
AN/SLR-12	Wideband countermeasures threat identification/warning receiver and direction finding system operating from 11–16 GHz (2.7–1.9 cm)	US Navy	
AN/SLR-25	Advanced Cryptologic Carry-on Exploitation System (ACCES) or Ship Signal Exploitation Equipment (SSEE) passive electronic support measures (ESM)/electronic warfare (EW) system operating from 0.5–18 GHz (60.0–1.7 cm), used with AN/SSQ-120	Arleigh Burke-class destroyers, Spruance-class destroyers, Ticonderoga-class cruisers, USS Blue Ridge (LCC-19), USS Wasp (LHD-1), USS Mount Whitney (LCC-20)	Sanders Associates

AN/SLY – Water Countermeasures Surveillance Systems
Designation	Purpose/Description	Location/Used By	Manufacturer
AN/SLY-2	Advanced Integrated Electronic Warfare System (AIEWS) electronic support measures (ESM) and electronic attack system, replaced AN/SLQ-32, AN/SSQ-82, AN/WLR-1	US Navy	Lockheed Martin

=== SPx – Water (surface ship or buoys) Radar Systems ===
AN/SPA – Water Radar Auxiliary Assembly Systems
Designation	Purpose/Description	Location/Used By	Manufacturer
AN/SPA-4	Shipboard surface search range-azimuth indicator radar/repeater with a range of 300 mi (480 km)	US Navy	Bendix Corp
AN/SPA-8	Shipboard surface search range-azimuth indicator radar/repeater with a range of 300 mi (480 km)	US Navy	Hazeltine Corp
AN/SPA-18	Shipboard surface search range-azimuth indicator radar/repeater with a range of 30 mi (48 km)	US Navy	The Austin Company
AN/SPA-25	Shipboard range-azimuth transistorized indicator search radar with a range of 300 mi (480 km)	US Navy	Motorola, Westinghouse
AN/SPA-33	Shipboard surface search range-azimuth indicator radar/repeater with a 300 mi (480 km) range, used with AN/SPS-26	US Navy	Hazeltine Corp
AN/SPA-34	Shipboard remote indicator radar with a 400 mi (640 km) range	US Navy	Philco
AN/SPA-40	Shipboard surface search range-azmuth indicator radar/repeater with a range of 300 mi (480 km) and operating up to 100,000 ft (30,000 m) altitude, used with AN/SPS-8 and AN/SPS-30	US Navy	General Electric
AN/SPA-41	Shipboard height-finding radar, replaced the AN/SPA-40		
AN/SPA-43	Shipboard intercept tracking radar		
AN/SPA-50	Shipboard surface search range-azimuth indicator radar/repeater		
AN/SPA-59	Shipboard surface search range-azimuth indicator radar/repeater with a 400-mile range		
AN/SPA-66	Shipboard remote indicator radar, replaced the AN/SPA-34		Hazeltine Corp, Dero R&D, Gulf Aerospace
AN/SPA-256	Radar display, used with AN/SPS-55		Cardion Electronics

AN/SPG – Water Radar Fire Control Systems
Designation	Purpose/Description	Location/Used By	Manufacturer
AN/SPG-49	3 MW C-band fire-control radar operating from 5.4–5.9 GHz (5.55–5.08 cm) with a range of 150 nmi (170 mi; 280 km)	USS Columbus (CG-12), USS Galveston (CLG-3), USS Oklahoma City (CL-91), USS Little Rock (CLG-4) for the RIM-8 Talos	Sperry Gyroscope
AN/SPG-51	81 kW fire-control radar operating at 5.45–5.825 GHz (5.50–5.15 cm) and 10.25–10.5 GHz (2.92–2.86 cm) with a range of 100 nmi (120 mi; 190 km)	California-class cruisers, Charles F. Adams-class destroyers, Kidd-class destroyers, Virginia-class cruisers for RIM-24 Tartar and RIM-66 Standard	Raytheon
AN/SPG-53	250 kW naval ship gun fire-control system radar with a range of 59 nmi (68 mi; 109 km)	Belknap-class cruisers, Charles F. Adams-class destroyers, Farragut-class destroyers, Forrest Sherman-class destroyers, Knox-class frigates, Mitscher-class destroyers	
AN/SPG-55	C/X-band sea missile 3D fire-control radar with a range of 150 nmi (170 mi; 280 km)	Belknap-class cruisers, Farragut-class destroyers, Leahy-class cruisers, Kitty Hawk-class aircraft carriers and ships USS Bainbridge (CGN-25), USS Long Beach (CGN-9), USS Truxtun (DLGN-35) for RIM-2 Terrier and RIM-67 Standard	
AN/SPG-59	Passive electronically scanned array (PESA) multifunction illumination/tracking radar with a range of 110 nmi (130 mi; 200 km)	Typhon Combat System, Did not enter service	Westinghouse
AN/SPG-60	Naval missile 3D monopulse Doppler fire-control radar	Charles F. Adams-class destroyers, Spruance-class destroyers, Kidd-class destroyers, Tarawa-class amphibious assault ships, California-class cruisers, Virginia-class cruisers for RIM-24 Tartar and RIM-66 Standard	
AN/SPG-62	10 kW X-band continuous wave (CW) narrow-beam missile terminal guidance fire-control radar operating from 8–12 GHz (3.75–2.50 cm) for Aegis Combat System	Arleigh Burke-class destroyers, Ticonderoga-class cruisers	Raytheon

AN/SPN – Water Radar Navigation Aid Systems
Designation	Purpose/Description	Location/Used By	Manufacturer
AN/SPN-10	All-weather Carrier Landing System (ACLS) with a 4 mi (6.4 km) lock-on range	USS America (CVA-66), USS Enterprise (CVAN-65), USS Franklin D. Roosevelt (CVA-42), USS Independence (CVA-62), USS Kitty Hawk (CVA-63), USS Midway (CVA-41), USS Ranger (CVA-61)	Bell Aircraft
AN/SPN-35	200 kW Precision Approach Radar (PAR) landing system operating from 9.0–9.2 GHz (3.33–3.26 cm), developed from AN/TPN-8	Tarawa-class amphibious assault ships, America-class amphibious assault ships, Wasp-class amphibious assault ships, Nimitz-class aircraft carriers	ITT-Gilfillan
AN/SPN-41	2.2 kW K_{u}-band Instrument Carrier Landing System (ICLS) radar operating between 15.412–15.688 GHz (1.95–1.91 cm) with a range of 48 nmi (55 mi; 89 km)	Kitty Hawk-class aircraft carriers	Cutler-Hammer
AN/SPN-42	Automated Carrier Landing System (ACLS) radar, replaced AN/SPN-10		
AN/SPN-43	1 MW S-band 2D air traffic control (ATC) radar operating from 3.5–3.7 GHz (8.57–8.10 cm) at a range of 50 nmi (58 mi; 93 km) up to 30,000 ft (9,100 m) altitude		ITT-Gilfillan
AN/SPN-44	Air traffic control Doppler radar	Kitty Hawk-class aircraft carriers	
AN/SPN-46	50 kW K_{a}/X-band monopulse Doppler radar Automatic Carrier Landing System (ACLS) with a range of 10 nmi (12 mi; 19 km)	Kitty Hawk-class aircraft carriers, Nimitz-class aircraft carriers	Textron Systems

AN/SPQ – Water Radar Special/Combination Systems
Designation	Purpose/Description	Location/Used By	Manufacturer
AN/SPQ-5	Long range over-the-horizon high-altitude radar	Boston-class cruisers for RIM-2 Terrier	Sperry Gyroscope
AN/SPQ-9	1.2 kW X-band multi-purpose track while scan (TWS) 2D pulse-Doppler frequency agile Anti-Ship Missile Defense (ASMD) surface search and fire-control radar	Spruance-class destroyers, Kidd-class destroyers, Arleigh Burke-class destroyers, Ticonderoga-class cruisers, Tarawa-class amphibious assault ships, California-class cruisers, Virginia-class cruisers	Northrop Grumman
AN/SPQ-11	Cobra Judy passive electronically scanned array (PESA) space tracking radar phased-array radar operating in E/F-bands between 2.9–3.1 GHz (10.34–9.67 cm), replaced by X and S-band Cobra King radars	USNS Observation Island (T-AGM-23)	

AN/SPS – Water Radar Detection/Range and Bearing Search Systems
Designation	Purpose/Description	Location/Used By	Manufacturer
AN/SPS-1	X-band air and surface surveillance radar	US Navy	
AN/SPS-2	Very-long range early warning height finder radar primarily used against aircraft and flat trajectory missiles with expected effective range of 295 nmi (339 mi; 546 km) up to 75,000 ft (23,000 m)	US Navy	
AN/SPS-5	285 kW medium range surface-search radar operating between 5.45–5.825 GHz (5.501–5.147 cm)	US Navy	
AN/SPS-6	500 kW L-band 2D air search radar operating between 1.25–1.35 GHz (24.0–22.2 cm)	US Navy	Bendix Corp, Westinghouse
AN/SPS-8	High-power 650 kW height finding radar and IFF interrogator operating from 3.43–3.55 GHz (8.7–8.4 cm) with a maximum range of 165 mi (266 km), used with AN/SPA-40	US Navy	General Electric
AN/SPS-10	500 kW 2D C-band medium-range surface search radar operating between 5.45–5.825 GHz (5.501–5.147 cm) with an effective range exceeding 100 mi (160 km), replaced by AN/SPS-67	US Navy	Raytheon
AN/SPS-12	500 kW L-band 2D medium range surveillance radar operating from 1.25–1.35 GHz (24.0–22.2 cm) with a range of 200 nmi (230 mi; 370 km)	US Navy	RCA Corp
AN/SPS-17	2D air search radar	US Navy	General Electric, ITE Circuit Breaker
AN/SPS-21	Short range surface-search radar		
AN/SPS-29	2D early-warning radar		General Electric
AN/SPS-30	High-power long range 3D air search radar, used with AN/SPA-40	Kitty Hawk-class aircraft carriers	General Electric
AN/SPS-32	SCANFAR 1.5 MW phased array air surveillance radar with a 400 nmi (460 mi; 740 km) range	USS Enterprise (CVN-65), USS Long Beach (CGN-9)	Hughes Aircraft
AN/SPS-33	SCANFAR 1.5 MW phased array target tracking radar with a 400 nmi (460 mi; 740 km) range	USS Enterprise (CVN-65), USS Long Beach (CGN-9)	Hughes Aircraft
AN/SPS-37	High-power long range air search radar	Kitty Hawk-class aircraft carriers	General Electric
AN/SPS-39	3D air search radar		Hughes Aircraft
AN/SPS-40	2D air search radar		Lockheed Corp, Norden Systems
AN/SPS-42	3D air search radar		
AN/SPS-43	Long range 2D air search radar	Forrestal-class aircraft carriers, Kitty Hawk-class aircraft carriers, Nimitz-class aircraft carriers: USS Nimitz (CVN-68), USS Dwight D. Eisenhower (CVN-69) and USS Carl Vinson (CVN-70)	
AN/SPS-48	3D sea air search radar	Forrestal-class aircraft carriers, Kitty Hawk-class aircraft carriers, Nimitz-class aircraft carriers, Virginia-class cruisers	Exelis
AN/SPS-49	2D long range air search radar	Kitty Hawk-class aircraft carriers, Nimitz-class aircraft carriers, Virginia-class cruisers	Raytheon
AN/SPS-51	75 kW surface search X band radar with a maximum range of 40 mi (64 km).	Hamilton class cutter	
AN/SPS-52	Long range 3D sea air search radar	Baleares-class frigates, Brooke-class frigates, Charles F. Adams-class destroyers, Hatakaze-class destroyers, Tarawa-class amphibious assault ships, Wasp-class amphibious assault ships, Galveston-class cruisers, Providence-class cruisers	
AN/SPS-53	Surface-search radar		
AN/SPS-55	Surface search radar, used with AN/SPA-256	Virginia-class cruisers	Cardion Electronics
AN/SPS-58	Low altitude 2D air search radar		
AN/SPS-64	Pathfinder S/X-band search and navigation radar transmitting at up to 60 kW operating at either 3–3.05 GHz (10.0–9.8 cm) or 9.35–9.4 GHz (3.21–3.19 cm) with a range of 64 nmi (74 mi; 119 km)	US Army, US Navy, US Coast Guard	Raytheon
AN/SPS-67	2D surface search radar operating in the 5.45–5.825 GHz (5.50–5.15 cm) range, replaced AN/SPS-10	Arleigh Burke-class destroyers	Norden Systems
AN/SPS-73	25 kW short-range 2D X-band surface search radar capable of tracking up to 200 targets, replaced AN/SPS-55 and AN/SPS-64	US Navy	Ultra Electronics, Raytheon
AN/SPS-77	Sea Giraffe 25 kW Agile Multi-Beam (AMB) 3D C-band multi-function search radar operating from 5.4–5.9 GHz (0.056–0.051 m) at distances of 110 mi (180 km) and altitudes up to 66,000 feet (20,000 m)	Independence-class littoral combat ships	Saab AB

AN/SPW – Water Radar Flight/Remote Control Systems
Designation	Purpose/Description	Location/Used By	Manufacturer
AN/SPW-2	Guidance radar	RIM-8 Talos	

AN/SPY – Water Radar Surveillance and Control Systems
Designation	Purpose/Description	Location/Used By	Manufacturer
AN/SPY-1	Passive Electronically Scanned Array (PESA) 3D radar	Arleigh Burke-class destroyers, Ticonderoga-class cruisers	Lockheed Martin Rotary and Mission Systems
AN/SPY-3	Active Electronically Scanned Array (AESA)	Gerald R. Ford-class aircraft carriers, Zumwalt-class destroyers	Raytheon
AN/SPY-6	Missile defense and air surveillance radar	Arleigh Burke-class destroyers, Constellation-class frigates, Gerald R. Ford-class aircraft carriers, America-class amphibious assault ships, San Antonio-class amphibious transport docks	Raytheon
AN/SPY-7	Long Range Discrimination Radar (LRDR) Active Electronically Scanned Array (AESA) early-warning system	Aegis Ballistic Missile Defense System	Lockheed Martin

=== SQx - Water (surface ship or buoys) Sonar Systems ===
AN/SQQ – Water Sonar Special/Combination Systems
Designation	Purpose/Description	Location/Used By	Manufacturer
AN/SQQ-23	Computer coordinated sonar		
AN/SQQ-32	Variable-depth Mine-hunting Sonar Set (MSS) detection and classification sonar with near-photographic quality resolution, replaced AN/SQQ-30	USS Avenger (MCM-1), USS Osprey (MHC-51)	Raytheon, Thales Underwater Systems
AN/SQQ-34	Carrier Vessel Tactical Support Center (CV-TSC) for Anti-Submarine Warfare (ASW) and Surface Warfare (SUW) on aircraft carriers	US Navy	
AN/SQQ-89	Undersea Warfare Combat System		Lockheed Martin Rotary and Mission Systems
AN/SQQ-90	ASW system		

AN/SQR – Water Sonar Receiving/Passive Detection Systems
Designation	Purpose/Description	Location/Used By	Manufacturer
AN/SQR-17	Sonobuoy processor part of Light Airborne Multi-Purpose System (LAMPS III) system	Knox-class frigates, Oliver Hazard Perry-class frigates, Spruance-class destroyers	Leonardo DRS
AN/SQR-18	Tactical towed array sonar system	Knox-class frigates	
AN/SQR-19	Tactical towed array sonar system	AN/SQQ-89	
AN/SQR-20	Active and passive Multi-Function Towed Array (MFTA) sonar system (now TB-37U)	Arleigh Burke-class destroyers, Ticonderoga-class cruisers, Zumwalt-class destroyers	Lockheed Martin

AN/SQS – Water Sonar Detection/Range and Bearing Search Systems
Designation	Purpose/Description	Location/Used By	Manufacturer
AN/SQS-23	Transducer sonar	Gearing-class destroyers	
AN/SQS-26	Bow mounted, low frequency, active/passive sonar	Belknap-class cruisers, Bronstein-class frigates, Brooke-class frigates, Garcia-class frigates, Knox-class frigates, Truxtun-class destroyers, Virginia-class cruisers	EDO Corp, General Electric
AN/SQS-35	Fish variable depth sonar system	Knox-class frigates	EDO Corp
AN/SQS-38	Hull-mounted version of the AN/SQS-35	Hamilton-class cutters	
AN/SQS-53	Bow mounted, low frequency, active/passive sonar	Arleigh Burke-class destroyers, Ticonderoga-class cruisers	EDO Corp, General Electric
AN/SQS-56	Hellen Keller hull mounted sonar system	Oliver Hazard Perry-class frigates	
AN/SQS-504	Diver medium-frequency active variable depth sonar	Annapolis-class destroyer, Leander-class frigate, River-class destroyer escort, St. Laurent-class destroyer	

=== SRx – Water (surface ship or buoys) Radio Systems ===
AN/SRC – Water Radio Communications Systems
Designation	Purpose/Description	Location/Used By	Manufacturer
AN/SRC-9	Radio navigation set	Virginia-class cruisers	
AN/SRC-20	UHF line-of-sight radio	Kitty Hawk-class aircraft carriers	
AN/SRC-21	UHF line-of-sight radio	Kitty Hawk-class aircraft carriers	
AN/SRC-31	300 watt UHF AM/FM data link transeiver operating from 225–400 MHz (133.24–74.95 cm)	Naval Tactical Data System, Virginia-class cruisers	Electronic Communications (division of NCR)

AN/SRQ – Water Radio Special/Combination Systems
Designation	Purpose/Description	Location/Used By	Manufacturer
AN/SRQ-4	Hawklink 1,261.1 lb (572.0 kg) shipborne K_{u}-band high-bandwidth sensor, video, network, and acoustic data radio terminal set communicating with fleet airborne assets operating from 14.53–15.35 GHz (2.063–1.953 cm) with a range of up to 100 nmi (120 mi; 190 km), software configurable to work with the Common Data Link (CDL) network, integrated with other shipborne ASW systems	Arleigh Burke-class destroyers, Oliver Hazard Perry-class frigates, Ticonderoga-class cruisers	L3Harris

=== SSx – Water (surface ship or buoys) Special/Combination Systems ===
AN/SSQ – Water Special/Combination Systems
Designation	Purpose/Description	Location/Used By	Manufacturer
AN/SSQ-1	Prototype sonobuoy		Magnavox
AN/SSQ-2	First mass-produced sonobuoy		
AN/SSQ-15	First production active sonobuoy, range-only (replaced in the late 1960s by AN/SSQ-47)		
AN/SSQ-20	Americanized version of the British T-1946 directional sonobuoy		
AN/SSQ-23	Julie omnidirectional low frequency passive sonobuoy		
AN/SSQ-28	Jezebel omnidirectional Low Frequency Analyzer and Recorder (LOFAR) passive sonobuoy		
AN/SSQ-36	BathyThermal (BT) sonobuoy		Ultra Electronics
AN/SSQ-41	Jezebel passive Low Frequency Analyzer and Recorder (LOFAR) passive sonobuoy, replaced both AN/SSQ-23 and AN/SSQ-28		
AN/SSQ-42	Extended Echo Ranging (EER) directional sonobuoy		Hazeltine Corp
AN/SSQ-46	Extended Echo Ranging (EER) directional sonobuoy		General Electric
AN/SSQ-47	Range only active sonobuoy		
AN/SSQ-48	Jezebel omnidirectional Low Frequency Analyzer and Recorder (LOFAR) passive sonobuoy		
AN/SSQ-50	Remote controlled Command Activated Sonobuoy System (CASS), replaced AN/SSQ-47		
AN/SSQ-53	Directional Low Frequency Analysis and Recording (DIFAR) passive directional sonobuoy	SH-2F Seasprite	Ultra Electronics
AN/SSQ-57	Low Frequency Analyzer and Recorder (LOFAR) passive sonobuoy, merged with DIFAR AN/SSQ-53		
AN/SSQ-61	Electronic bathythermograph, replaced by AN/BQH-7		Sippican
AN/SSQ-62	Directional Command Activated Sonobuoy System (DICASS) active sonobuoy, replaces AN/SSQ-47 and AN/SSQ-50	SH-2F Seasprite	Ultra Electronics
AN/SSQ-75	Expendable Reliable Acoustic Path Sonobuoy (ERAPS) active sonobuoy		
AN/SSQ-77	Vertical Line Array Directional (VLAD) Directional Low Frequency Analysis and Recording (DIFAR) sonobuoy		
AN/SSQ-86	Data Link Communications (DLC) sonobuoy		
AN/SSQ-95	Active electronic I/J-band sonobuoy antiship missile decoy		Litton Industries, Magnavox
AN/SSQ-101	Air Deployable Active Receiver (ADAR) sonobuoy		
AN/SSQ-110	Extended Echo Ranging (EER) sonobuoy		
AN/SSQ-108	OUTBOARD and OUTBOARD II		
AN/SSQ-120	Transportable HF/VHF/UHF radio direction finding system		
AN/SSQ-125	Active sonobuoy		
AN/SSQ-137	Open architecture Ship Signal Exploitation Equipment (SSEE) signals intelligence (SIGINT) and command and control system	US Navy	Argon ST
AN/SSQ-536	Bathy Thermograph (BT) sonobuoy		Ultra Electronics
AN/SSQ-553	Directional passive sonobuoy		Ultra Electronics
AN/SSQ-565	Multistatic low frequency active source sonobuoy		Ultra Electronics
AN/SSQ-573	Directional low frequency active receiver sonobuoy		Ultra Electronics
AN/SSQ-906	Omnidirectional Low Frequency Analyzer and Recorder (LOFAR) sonobuoy		Ultra Electronics
AN/SSQ-926	Active transmitter sonobuoy		Ultra Electronics
AN/SSQ-955	Directional passive sonobuoy		Ultra Electronics
AN/SSQ-963	Radio controlled directional Command Active Multi-Beam Sonobuoy (CAMBS)		Ultra Electronics

=== SYx – Water (surface ship or buoys) Data Processing/Computer Systems ===
AN/SYA – Water Data Processing/Computer Auxiliary Assembly Systems
Designation	Purpose/Description	Location/Used By	Manufacturer
AN/SYA-1	Tactical display system		
AN/SYA-4	Tactical display system		

AN/SYS – Water Data Processing/Computer Detection/Range and Bearing Search Systems
Designation	Purpose/Description	Location/Used By	Manufacturer
AN/SYS-1	Automatic Detection & Tracking System		Hughes Aircraft, Dynell Electronics, Sperry Univac
AN/SYS-2	Sea mission computer		

AN/:
- Top
- A–G
- M
- P
- S
- T
- U
- V
- W
- Z
- See also
- References
- Bibliography
- Further reading
- External links
- Main list

== T ==
=== TAx – Transportable Infrared Systems ===
AN/TAS – Transportable Infrared Detection/Range and Bearing Search Systems
Designation	Purpose/Description	Location/Used By	Manufacturer
AN/TAS-2	34 lb (15 kg) tripod-mounted Night Observation Device, Long Range (NODLR) 3–5 μm infrared (IR) 3 ft (0.91 m) long and 1 ft (30 cm) diameter thermal imager sight with an effective range of 4,400 yd (4,000 m)		Hughes Aircraft
AN/TAS-4	Portable 22 lb (10.0 kg) monocular thermal imaging night sight with a spectral range of 7.5–12 μm. It is the primary component of AN/UAS-12	M151A2 TOW, M220 TOW, M901 ITV, M981 FISTV	Texas Instruments

=== TCx – Transportable Carrier Systems ===
AN/TCC – Transportable Carrier Communications Systems
Designation	Purpose/Description	Location/Used By	Manufacturer
AN/TCC-38	Automatic telephone Central Office with 300 lines	US Marine Corps	
AN/TCC-42	Telephone switching central	US Marine Corps	
AN/TCC-72	Multiplex telephone terminal	US Marine Corps	

=== TGx – Transportable Telegraph/Teletype Systems ===
AN/TGC – Transportable Telegraph/Teletype Communication Systems
Designation	Purpose/Description	Location/Used By	Manufacturer
AN/TGC-14	Lightweight teletypewriter set, developed as a commercial teleprinter (MITE Mod 104)	US Marine Corps	Mite Corp
AN/TGC-29	Teletype with automatic send/receive (ASR) configuration	US Marine Corps	
AN/TGC-46	Teletype Central	US Marine Corps	

=== TLx – Transportable Countermeasures Systems ===
AN/TLQ – Transportable Countermeasures Special/Combination Systems
Designation	Purpose/Description	Location/Used By	Manufacturer
AN/TLQ-15	COMJAM HF communications countermeasures system, normally collocated with AN/GLC-3 systems	US Army	
AN/TLQ-17	Traffic Jam 550 watt HF/VHF communications countermeasures system, used in AN/ALQ-151 Quickfix system, replaced by AN/MLQ-40	EH-60A Black Hawk, HMMWV, M1028 CUCV	
AN/TLQ-32	112 lb (51 kg) 680 watt anti-radiation missile (ARM) seduction/emulation decoy operating between 2.9–3.1 GHz (10.3–9.7 cm), initially protecting AN/TPS-75 but later capable of protecting others	US Army	ITT

AN/TLR – Transportable Countermeasures Receiver/Passive Detection Systems
Designation	Purpose/Description	Location/Used By	Manufacturer
AN/TLR-3	Countermeasures receiver operating from 12–18 GHz (2.5–1.7 cm)	US Army	Signal Corps Laboratories
AN/TLR-4	Mechanically tuned rapid-scan superheterodyne receiver operating from 1.05–3.6 GHz (28.6–8.3 cm)	US Army	Signal Corps Laboratories
AN/TLR-9	Mechanically tuned rapid-scan receiver operating from 60–1,060 MHz (5.00–0.28 m)	US Army	Signal Corps Laboratories
AN/TLR-10	Mechanically tuned rapid-scan superheterodyne receiver operating from 60–1,060 MHz (5.00–0.28 m) at sensitivities between −101 to −73 dBm	US Army	Signal Corps Laboratories
AN/TLR-15	Countermeasures receiver operating from 8–41 GHz (3.75–0.73 cm) using backward-wave oscillators	US Army	Signal Corps Laboratories
AN/TLR-17	Countermeasures receiver operating from 0.5–12 MHz (600–25 m)	US Army	Signal Corps Laboratories
AN/TLR-31	Trusty Hunter countermeasures non-communications ELINT system operating from 10–40 GHz (3.00–0.75 cm)	US Army	

=== TMx – Transportable Meteorological Systems ===
AN/TMQ – Transportable Meteorological Special/Combination Systems
Designation	Purpose/Description	Location/Used By	Manufacturer
AN/TMQ-4	Manual meteorological station	US Marine Corps	
AN/TMQ-7	Manual meteorological station	US Marine Corps	
AN/TMQ-19	Meteorological radar for use in AN/UMQ-7 system		Servo Corp of America
AN/TMQ-22	Portable weather observing pack, measures ambient pressure, temperature, dew point, surface wind, and precipitation		Cambridge Systems
AN/TMQ-53	Transportable Meteorological Observing System (TMOS)		

=== TNx – Transportable Sound Systems ===
AN/TNS – Transportable Sound Detecting/Range and Bearing Search Systems
Designation	Purpose/Description	Location/Used By	Manufacturer
AN/TNS-10	Transportable counter battery passive sound ranging system covering an area 6.2 mi (10 km) wide and up to 12 mi (20 km) range, often used with AN/GRA-114		

=== TPx – Transportable Radar Systems ===
AN/TPN – Transportable Radar Navigational Aid Systems
Designation	Purpose/Description	Location/Used By	Manufacturer
AN/TPN-1	Transportable Eureka radar beacon operating between 170–234 MHz (1.76–1.28 m) and weighing 150 lb (68 kg)		
AN/TPN-7	500 watt transportable radar beacon operating between 8.9–9.4 GHz (3.37–3.19 cm)		
AN/TPN-8	200 kW X-band air traffic control radar operating from 9–9.6 GHz (3.33–3.12 cm) with a 40 nmi (46 mi; 74 km) range, forerunner of AN/SPN-35 and AN/TPN-18		ITT-Gilfillan
AN/TPN-9	200 watt transportable radar beacon operating between 5.46–5.825 GHz (5.49–5.15 cm)		
AN/TPN-18	200 kW transportable Ground Controlled Approach (GCA) radar operating between 9–9.6 GHz (3.33–3.12 cm) with a range of 40 nmi (46 mi; 74 km), part of AN/TSQ-71 and AN/TSQ-72, developed from AN/TPN-8		ITT-Gilfillan
AN/TPN-22	200 kW transportable All-weather Landing System (ALS) 3D Precision Approach Radar (PAR)		ITT-Gilfillan
AN/TPN-24	450 kW transportable Airport Surveillance Radar (ASR) operating between 2.7–2.9 GHz (11.10–10.34 cm)		Raytheon
AN/TPN-25	300 kW transportable Precision Approach Radar (PAR) operating from 9–9.2 GHz (3.33–3.26 cm)		
AN/TPN-30	Marine Remote Area Approach and Landing System (MRAALS)	US Marine Corps	
AN/TPN-31	Mobile S/X-band autonomous Air Traffic Navigation Integration and Coordination System (ATNAVICS) precision approach radar (PAR) with an airport surveillance range of 29 mi (46 km) and PAR range of 17 mi (28 km), replaced Marine Air Traffic Control and Landing Systems (MATCALS)	US Marine Corps	Raytheon

AN/TPQ – Transportable Radar Special/Combination Systems
Designation	Purpose/Description	Location/Used By	Manufacturer
AN/TPQ-2	Transportable close air support radar/computer/communications system with the 210 kW SCR-584 radar operating between 2.74–2.96 GHz (10.94–10.13 cm) at a range of 40 mi (64 km), replaced by AN/MPQ-14		Reeves Instrument Corp
AN/TPQ-3	Transportable counter-battery radar system comprising modified AN/TPS-3 radar operating at 500–610 MHz (59.96–49.15 cm) with a much shorter range of 6.8 mi (10.9 km)		
AN/TPQ-10	Transportable Radar Course Directing Central (RCDC) system 250 kW X-band radar used for close air support with a range of 110 mi (180 km), replaced AN/MPQ-14	US Marine Corps	General Electric
AN/TPQ-12	Transportable counter-battery radar operating at 8.9–9.4 GHz (3.37–3.19 cm)		
AN/TPQ-27	Radar Course Direction Central (RCDC) ground support/bomb directing radar, range of 100 nmi (120 mi; 190 km), replaced AN/TPQ-10	US Marine Corps	
AN/TPQ-36	Mobile 23 kW passive electronically scanned array (PESA) X-band counter-battery radar with a maximum range of 15 mi (24 km)	US Army, US Marine Corps	Northrop Grumman, ThalesRaytheonSystems
AN/TPQ-37	Mobile 120 kW passive electronically scanned array (PESA) S-band counter-battery radar with a range of 31 mi (50 km)		Hughes Aircraft, ThalesRaytheonSystems
AN/TPQ-39	250 kW Instrumentation Tracking Radar operating at 5.45–5.825 GHz (5.50–5.15 cm)		General Electric
AN/TPQ-43	Precision automatic tracking I-band pulse-Doppler radar, replaced AN/MSQ-46 and AN/MSQ-77, part of AN/MPQ-49 Forward Area Alerting Radar (FAAR)	M48 Chaparral, M163 Vulcan Air Defense System (VADS)	LTV Corp
AN/TPQ-46	Lightweight Firefinder counter-battery radar operating in 9.37–9.99 GHz (3.20–3.00 cm) frequency range, upgrade of AN/TPQ-36 Firefinder radar, replaced by AN/TPS-80 G/ATOR	US Marine Corps	Raytheon, Northrop Grumman
AN/TPQ-47	Phoenix Battlefield Sensor System (PBS^{2}) transportable Firefinder counter-battery radar operating between 2–4 GHz (14.99–7.49 cm) with a range of 37 mi (60 km) for artillery and 190 mi (300 km) for tactical ballistic missiles		ThalesRaytheonSystems
AN/TPQ-48	Lightweight Counter Mortar Radar (LCMR)		
AN/TPQ-49	Lightweight Counter Mortar Radar (LCMR)		
AN/TPQ-50	Humvee-mounted Lightweight Counter Mortar Radar (LCMR)		
AN/TPQ-53	Mobile Active Electronically Scanned Array (AESA) counter-battery radar	US Army	Lockheed Martin

AN/TPS – Transportable Radar Detection/Range and Bearing Search Systems
Designation	Purpose/Description	Location/Used By	Manufacturer
AN/TPS-1	615 kW transportable tactical control and early-warning radar operating at 1.22–1.35 GHz (24.57–22.21 cm) with a range of 160 nmi (180 mi; 300 km)		Western Electric, Bendix Corp, Raytheon
AN/TPS-3	200 kW mobile lightweight medium-to-long range early warning radar, also known as SCR-602-T8, operating between 590–610 MHz (50.81–49.15 cm) with a range of 120 mi (190 km) at an altitude of 30,000 ft (9,100 m), converted to AN/TPQ-3 (Note: In reference to the AN/TPS-3, Wikipedia article SCR-602 (AN/TPS-3) says the frequency is 176–202 MHz (170.34–148.41 cm) instead of 590–610 MHz (50.81–49.15 cm) claimed by the MobileRadar.org site cited in this list)	US Army	Zenith Radio Co
AN/TPS-10	250 kW X-band height finder radar operating from 9.23–9.404 GHz (3.25–3.19 cm) with a range of 120 nmi (140 mi; 220 km) at up to 60,000 ft (18,000 m)	US Air Force	RCA Corp
AN/TPS-15	500 kW air-and-ground surveillance radar operating from 1.22–1.35 GHz (24.57–22.21 cm) with a range of 160 nmi (180 mi; 300 km)		Raytheon
AN/TPS-21	7 kW battlefield surveillance radar operating from 9.345–9.405 GHz (3.21–3.19 cm)		Admiral Corp
AN/TPS-22	UHF surveillance radar operating between 406–450 MHz (73.84–66.62 cm) at 2 MW, replaced by AN/TPS-59	US Marine Corps	Westinghouse Electric
AN/TPS-25	43 kW battlefield surveillance radar operating from 9.345–9.405 GHz (3.21–3.19 cm) with a range of 2.8 mi (4.5 km) for personnel and 11.36 mi (18.28 km) for vehicles		
AN/TPS-27	3.5 megawatt air surveillance 3D radar operating from 2.7–2.9 GHz (11.10–10.34 cm)		Westinghouse Electric
AN/TPS-28	1 megawatt search radar operating from 200–225 MHz (149.90–133.24 cm) with a range of 200 nmi (230 mi; 370 km)		Hazeltine Corp
AN/TPS-31	40 kW harbor surveillance and control radar operating from 9.36–9.46 GHz (3.20–3.17 cm)		Raytheon
AN/TPS-32	2.8 megawatt tactical lightweight amphibious assault 3D radar operating between 2.905–3.08 GHz (10.32–9.73 cm) with a range of up to 300 mi (480 km) at 100,000 ft (30,000 m) altitude	US Marine Corps	ITT-Gilfillan
AN/TPS-34	5 megawatt forward area air defense 3D radar operating at 1.3 GHz (23.06 cm) with a 250 mi (400 km) range		Lockheed Martin
AN/TPS-41	250 kW transportable weather radar X-band operating between 8.5–9.6 GHz (3.53–3.12 cm) with a range of 150 mi (240 km)	US Army	Fairchild Hiller
AN/TPS-42	Man-pack portable UHF 3D short range air defense (SHORAD) radar with a range of 19 mi (30 km) up to 30,000 ft (9,100 m)	US Air Force	Rome Air Development Center
AN/TPS-43	4 megawatt transportable 3D air S-band search radar operating from 2.9–3.1 GHz (10.34–9.67 cm) with a maximum range of 240 nmi (280 mi; 440 km), forerunner of AN/TPS-75		Westinghouse Electric, US Dynamics
AN/TPS-44	Air surveillance radar		Cardion Electronics
AN/TPS-58	Vehicle mounted Moving-Target-Locating Radar (MTLR) detects personnel at 10 km (6.2 mi) and vehicles at 12 mi (20 km)	US Army	
AN/TPS-59	Transportable long-range L-band active electronically scanned array (AESA) air surveillance and theater ballistic missile (TBM) detection 3D radar developed from AN/FPS-117, replaced AN/TPS-22	US Marine Corps	General Electric, Lockheed Martin, US Dynamics
AN/TPS-63	Mobile medium-range 2D surveillance radar operating from 1.25–1.35 GHz (23.98–22.21 cm), replaced the AN/UPS-1, replaced by AN/TPS-80 G/ATOR	US Marine Corps	Northrop Grumman, US Dynamics
AN/TPS-65	Airfield surveillance radar for air traffic control, developed from AN/TPS-63		Northrop Grumman
AN/TPS-68	Tactical C-band weather radar operating at 5.4 cm (5.6 GHz) at 165 kW	US Air Force	Naval Avionics Facility, Indianapolis
AN/TPS-70	3.5 MW mobile phased array S-band 3D radar operating between 2.9 and 3 GHz (10.3 and 10.0 cm) with a range of 280 mi (450 km) at altitudes up to 100,000 ft (30,000 m), replaced AN/TPS-43, replaced by AN/TPS-78		Westinghouse Electric, US Dynamics
AN/TPS-71	Tactical HF bistatic Relocatable Over-the-Horizon Radar (ROTHR) operating between 5–28 MHz (59.96–10.71 m) at 200 kW with a range of up to 1,600 nmi (1,800 mi; 3,000 km)	US Navy	Raytheon
AN/TPS-72	Planar array E/F-band air search radar		Westinghouse Electric
AN/TPS-73	S-band multi-functional air traffic control radar, replaced by AN/TPS-80 G/ATOR	US Marine Corps	Alenia Marconi Systems, Lockheed Martin
AN/TPS-75	Transportable passive electronically scanned array (PESA) 3D air search radar, developed from AN/TPS-43		Westinghouse Electric, US Dynamics
AN/TPS-77	19.9 kW transportable long-range D/L-band 1.215–1.4 GHz (24.67–21.41 cm) 3D radar with active electronically scanned array (AESA) air surveillance and theater ballistic missile (TBM) detection at a range of 290 mi (470 km) and an altitude of 100,000 ft (30,000 m), developed from AN/FPS-117		Lockheed Martin, US Dynamics
AN/TPS-78	Advanced Capability (ADCAP) Multi-Mode Radar (MMR) mobile phased array S-band long range air surveillance 3D radar with a range of 240 nmi (280 mi; 440 km), replaced AN/TPS-70		Northrop Grumman
AN/TPS-80	Mobile Active Electronically Scanned Array (AESA) S-band Ground/Air Task Oriented Radar (G/ATOR), replaced AN/TPS-63 and AN/TPS-73	US Marine Corps	Northrop Grumman

AN/TPX – Transportable Radar Identification/Recognition Systems
Designation	Purpose/Description	Location/Used By	Manufacturer
AN/TPX-46	Interrogator Set, ground portion of the DOD A.C. Cossor AIMS Mark XII Identification Friend or Foe (IFF) System	MIM-23 Hawk, MIM-14 Nike Hercules, and Army Air Defense Control and Coordination Systems	Hazeltine Corp
AN/TPX-50	Mark XII Identification Friend or Foe (IFF) receiver	MIM-23 Hawk, MIM-14 Nike Hercules, and Army Air Defense Control and Coordination Systems	Hazeltine Corp

AN/TPY – Transportable Radar Surveillance and Control Systems
Designation	Purpose/Description	Location/Used By	Manufacturer
AN/TPY-2	Forward Based X-band Transportable (FBX-T) radar	Terminal High Altitude Area Defense (THAAD) anti-ballistic missile	Raytheon
AN/TPY-4	L-band multi-function 3D radar		Lockheed Martin

=== TRx – Transportable Radio Systems ===
AN/TRC – Transportable Radio Communications Systems
Designation	Purpose/Description	Location/Used By	Manufacturer
AN/TRC-75	Radio, replaced by AN/GRC-193	US Marine Corps	
AN/TRC-80	Track 80 radio terminaloperating in the 4.4–5 GHz (6.81–6.00 cm) range at 1 kW	MGM-31 Pershing	Rockwell Collins
AN/TRC-97	Mobile radio terminal with a range of 40 mi (64 km) line of sight, or 96 mi (154 km) using tropospheric scatter at frequencies of 1.2–2.2 GHz (24.98–13.63 cm) or 4.4–5 GHz (6.81–6.00 cm)	Air National Guard, US Air Force, US Marine Corps	RCA Corp
AN/TRC-170	Transportable troposcatter SHF radio terminal set operating in the 4.4–5 GHz (6.81–6.00 cm) range	US Marine Corps	

AN/TRQ – Transportable Radio Special/Combination Systems
Designation	Purpose/Description	Location/Used By	Manufacturer
AN/TRQ-30	Communications intelligence (COMINT) receiver, used as a backup for AN/TRQ-32		
AN/TRQ-32	Teammate mobile communications intelligence (COMINT) HF/VHF/UHF receiver and VHF-only direction finding system	M1028 CUCV, HMMWV	
AN/TRQ-35	Tactical Frequency Management System (TFMS) for HF communication	US Marine Corps	

AN/TRS – Transportable Radio Detection/Range and Bearing Search Systems
Designation	Purpose/Description	Location/Used By	Manufacturer
AN/TRS-9	Global Broadcast Service (GBS), Transportable Ground Receive Suite (TGRS) Enhanced that receives one-way satellite transmissions in the K_{u}-band and K_{a}-band ranges	US Marine Corps	Raytheon

=== TSx – Transportable Special/Combination Systems ===
AN/TSC – Transportable Special/Combination Communications Systems
Designation	Purpose/Description	Location/Used By	Manufacturer
AN/TSC-15	Communications Central	US Marine Corps	
AN/TSC-85	Tactical SHF satellite communications (SATCOM) terminal	US Marine Corps	CECOM
AN/TSC-93	Tactical SHF satellite communications (SATCOM) terminal	US Marine Corps	CECOM
AN/TSC-96	Satellite communications (SATCOM) radio	US Marine Corps	

AN/TSQ – Transportable Special/Combination Systems
Designation	Purpose/Description	Location/Used By	Manufacturer
AN/TSQ-8	Coordinate Data Set, Command, control and coordination system	Project Nike	The Martin Company
AN/TSQ-38	Helicopter-transportable Battalion Missile Operations System, variant of AN/MSQ-18	Project Nike	Raytheon
AN/TSQ-51	Missile Mentor air defense Command, control and coordination system computer	Project Nike	Hughes Aircraft
AN/TSQ-71	Landing Control Central ground-controlled approach (GCA), consists of AN/TPN-18, AN/VRC-46, AN/ARC-73 and AN/ARC-51, replaced by AN/TPN-31		
AN/TSQ-72	Landing Control Central target acquisition radar control		
AN/TSQ-73	Missile Minder Army Tactical Air Control System/Tactical Air Defense System		
AN/TSQ-81	Combat Skyspot ground directed bombing unit, transportable version of AN/MSQ-77		
AN/TSQ-84	Communications Technical Control Center, replaced by AN/TSQ-111	US Marine Corps	
AN/TSQ-90	Tactical Electronic Reconnaissance Processing and Evaluation System (TERPES) mobile ground data processing system	US Marine Corps	Naval Surface Warfare Center
AN/TSQ-91	Tactical Air Control System/Tactical Air Defense System		
AN/TSQ-96	Bomb directing central automatic tracking radar/computer/communications system		Reeves Instrument Corp
AN/TSQ-111	Communications Technical Control Center, replaced AN/TSQ-84	US Marine Corps	
AN/TSQ-112	Tactical communications intercept and direction finding system, used with AN/MLQ-34 TACJAM		
AN/TSQ-129	Position Location Reporting System (PLRS)	US Army, US Marine Corps	
AN/TSQ-130	Tactical transportable Technical Control and Analysis Center (TCAC) for signals intelligence (SIGINT) processing, replaced by AN/MYQ-8	US Marine Corps	
AN/TSQ-138	Trailblazer HF/VHF/UHF communications intercept and VHF direction finding system, replaced by AN/MLQ-40	US Army M1015 tracked cargo carrier	
AN/TSQ-158	Enhanced Position Location Reporting System (EPLRS) Network Manager (ENM) ruggedized laptop	US Marine Corps	Raytheon
AN/TSQ-178	Joint Surveillance Target Attack Radar System (JSTARS) ground station		
AN/TSQ-179	Joint Surveillance Target Attack Radar System (JSTARS) Common Ground Station (CGS)	US Marine Corps	General Dynamics
AN/TSQ-190	Trojan Spirit II (Special Purpose Intelligence Remote Integrated Terminal II) mobile SHF C/K_{u}/X-band satellite communications (SATCOM) system	US Marine Corps	
AN/TSQ-198	Tactical Terminal Control System (TTCS) mobile air traffic control facility		
AN/TSQ-220	Joint Services Workstation (JSWS) multi-sensor Command, Control, Communications, Computers and Intelligence (C^{4}I) system	US Marine Corps	
AN/TSQ-222	Tactical Data Network (TDN), Gateway	US Marine Corps	General Dynamics
AN/TSQ-226	Trojan Special Purpose Intelligence Remote Integrated Terminal Lightweight Integrated Telecommunications Equipment (Trojan SPIRIT LITE) SHF C/K_{u}-band multi-channel satellite communications (SATCOM) terminal	US Marine Corps	Global SATCOM Technology
AN/TSQ-227	Digital Technical Control (DTC) facility is the central data management facility integrating digital communication assets	US Marine Corps	General Dynamics
AN/TSQ-228	Data Distribution System (DDS) or Tactical Data Network (TDN) server	US Marine Corps	General Dynamics
AN/TSQ-231	Joint Enhanced Core Communications System (JECCS)	US Marine Corps	EDO Corp
AN/TSQ-236	Tactical Exploitation Group-Remote Workstation (TEG-RWS)	US Marine Corps	Northrop Grumman

=== TTx – Transportable Telephone Systems ===
AN/TTC – Transportable Telephone Communications Systems
Designation	Purpose/Description	Location/Used By	Manufacturer
AN/TTC-38	Automatic telephone Central Office	US Marine Corps	
AN/TTC-42	Automatic telephone Central Office	US Marine Corps	

=== TVx – Transportable Visual/Visible Light Systems ===
AN/TVS – Transportable Visual/Visible Light Detection/Range and Bearing Search Systems
Designation	Purpose/Description	Location/Used By	Manufacturer
AN/TVS-5	Night vision observation scope with a detection range of over 3,300 ft (1 km), variant of AN/PVS-4, replaced by AN/PVS-13		

AN/TVQ – Transportable Visual/Visible Light Special/Combination Systems
Designation	Purpose/Description	Location/Used By	Manufacturer
AN/TVQ-2	52 lb (24 kg) tripod or vehicle mounted near infrared Ground Laser Locator Designator (GLLD)	US Army	

=== TWx – Transportable Armament Systems ===
AN/TWQ – Transportable Armament Special/Combination Systems
Designation	Purpose/Description	Location/Used By	Manufacturer
AN/TWQ-1	Avenger self-propelled short range air defense surface-to-air missile system		Boeing

=== TYx – Transportable Data Processing/Computer Systems ===
AN/TYA – Transportable Data Processing/Computer Auxiliary Assembly Systems
Designation	Purpose/Description	Location/Used By	Manufacturer
AN/TYA-5	Central Computer Group	AN/TYQ-2 in the Tactical Air Operations Center (TAOC)	
AN/TYA-6	Data Processor Group	AN/TYQ-2 in the Tactical Air Operations Center (TAOC)	
AN/TYA-7	Geographic Display Generations Group	AN/TYQ-2 in the Tactical Air Operations Center (TAOC)	
AN/TYA-9	Operator Group	AN/TYQ-2 in the Tactical Air Operations Center (TAOC)	
AN/TYA-12	Communications Group	AN/TYQ-2 in the Tactical Air Operations Center (TAOC)	
AN/TYA-20	Shelter housing the CP-808 computer	AN/TYQ-3 Tactical Data Communications Central (TDCC)	
AN/TYA-23	Transportable shelters	AN/TYQ-2 in the Tactical Air Operations Center (TAOC)	
AN/TYA-25	Photographic Transport Group	AN/TYQ-2 in the Tactical Air Operations Center (TAOC)	
AN/TYA-26	Ancillary Group	AN/TYQ-2 in the Tactical Air Operations Center (TAOC)	

AN/TYC – Transportable Data Processing/Computer Communication Systems
Designation	Purpose/Description	Location/Used By	Manufacturer
AN/TYC-5	Automatic Digital Network (AUTODIN) terminal	US Marine Corps	
AN/TYC-11	Telephone switching central	US Marine Corps	

AN/TYQ – Transportable Data Processing/Computer Special/Combination Systems
Designation	Purpose/Description	Location/Used By	Manufacturer
AN/TYQ-1	Tactical Air Command Central (TACC)	Marine Tactical Data System (MTDS)	Philco-Ford
AN/TYQ-2	Tactical Air Operations Central (TAOC)	Marine Tactical Data System (MTDS)	Litton Industries
AN/TYQ-3	Tactical Data Communications Central (TDCC)	Marine Tactical Data System (MTDS)	Collins Radio, Sperry Univac
AN/TYQ-23	Tactical Air Operations Central (TAOC) system, replaced Marine Tactical Data System (MTDS), interfaces with AN/MSQ-124 Air Defense Communications Platform (ADCP) and the AN/TPS-59 radar system.	US Marine Corps	Northrop Grumman
AN/TYQ-87	Sector Anti-Air Warfare Facility (SAAWF)	US Marine Corps	Northrop Grumman
AN/TYQ-101	Communications Data Link System (CDLS) automated interface system	US Marine Corps	

AN/TYY – Transportable Data Processing/Computer Surveillance and Control Systems
Designation	Purpose/Description	Location/Used By	Manufacturer
AN/TYY-2	27 workstation Tactical Battle Management Core System (TBMCS), also called Tactical Command System (TCS), is an air war planning tool	US Marine Corps	Lockheed Martin

AN/:
- Top
- A–G
- M
- P
- S
- T
- U
- V
- W
- Z
- See also
- References
- Bibliography
- Further reading
- External links
- Main list

== U ==
=== UAx – Utility Infrared Systems ===
AN/UAS – Utility Infrared Detection/Range and Bearing Search Systems
Designation	Purpose/Description	Location/Used By	Manufacturer
AN/UAS-4	Red Haze infrared line scanning surveillance system using film, replaced by AN/UAS-14	OV-1C Mohawk,	
AN/UAS-14	Infrared surveillance system with data link, replaced AN/UAS-4	OV-1C Mohawk	

=== UDx – Utility Radiation and Detection (RADIAC) Systems ===
AN/UDR – Utility RADIAC Receiver/Passive Detection Systems
Designation	Purpose/Description	Location/Used By	Manufacturer
AN/UDR-13	Pocket RADIAC dosimeter to measure initial and residual gamma radiation and prompt neutron radiation		

=== UGx – Utility Telegraph/Teletype Systems ===
AN/UGC – Utility Telegraph/Teletype Communications Equipment
Designation	Purpose/Description	Location/Used By	Manufacturer
AN/UGC-74	Ruggedized communications terminal bit serial full duplex multi-speed page tactical teletype with 16K receive buffer with print speeds from 60 to 600 wpm, used with AN/GRC-106 or AN/GRC-142 RTTY systems	US Army, US Marine Corps	Kleinschmidt

=== ULx – Utility Countermeasures Systems ===
AN/ULQ – Utility Countermeasures Special/Combination Systems
Designation	Purpose/Description	Location/Used By	Manufacturer
AN/ULQ-6	Shipborne 25 kW deception repeater jamming and decoy system operating from 2–18 GHz (15.0–1.7 cm) used in combination with AN/WLR-1	Iowa-class battleships, Knox-class frigates	
AN/ULQ-19	RACJAM 250 watt ground-based mobile VHF communications electronic attack system operating between 20–80 MHz (14.99–3.75 m)	US Army, US Marine Corps	BAE

AN/ULR – Utility Countermeasures Receiver/Passive Detection Systems
Designation	Purpose/Description	Location/Used By	Manufacturer
AN/ULR-21	Classic Troll Advanced Submarine Tactical ESM Combat System (ASTECS) detecting both radar and communications signals	Los Angeles-class submarines, Seawolf-class submarines	Lockheed Martin

=== UPx - Utility Radar Systems ===
AN/UPS – Utility Radar Detection/Range and Bearing Search Systems
Designation	Purpose/Description	Location/Used By	Manufacturer
AN/UPS-1	1 MW 2D air surveillance and early warning radar operating between 1.25–1.35 GHz (23.98–22.21 cm) with a range of 160 mi (260 km), replaced by AN/TPS-63	US Marine Corps	RCA Corp

AN/UPX – Utility Radar Identification/Recognition Systems
Designation	Purpose/Description	Location/Used By	Manufacturer
AN/UPX-24	Identification Friend or Foe (IFF) interrogator		Northrop Grumman
AN/UPX-27	Identification Friend or Foe (IFF) interrogator, part of AN/UPX-29 interrogator system transmitting at 1.03 GHz (29.11 cm) and receiving at 1.09 GHz (27.50 cm), replaced by AN/UPX-37	US Marine Corps	
AN/UPX-29	Centralized stand-alone Mk XII Identification Friend or Foe (IFF) interrogator and target processor	Arleigh Burke-class destroyers, Nimitz-class aircraft carriers, Ticonderoga-class cruisers, Wasp-class amphibious assault ships	
AN/UPX-37	Digital Identification Friend or Foe (IFF) interrogator, replaced the AN/UPX-27	US Marine Corps	BAE

=== UQx – Utility Carrier Systems ===
AN/UQQ – Utility Sonar Special/Combination Systems
Designation	Purpose/Description	Location/Used By	Manufacturer
AN/UQQ-2	Surveillance Towed Array Sensor System (SURTASS) sonar	USNS Impeccable (T-AGOS-23), Victorious-class ocean surveillance ships	

=== URx – Utility Radio Systems ===
AN/URC – Utility Radio Communications Systems
Designation	Purpose/Description	Location/Used By	Manufacturer
AN/URC-4	Emergency survival radio operates at 121.5 MHz (2.47 m) and 243 MHz (1.23 m)		
AN/URC-10	Transistorized UHF emergency survival radio		
AN/URC-11	Emergency survival radio operating at 243 MHz (1.23 m)		
AN/URC-14	Emergency survival radio operating at 121.5 MHz (2.47 m)		
AN/URC-32	Shipboard HF single-sideband transceiver operating at 2–30 MHz (149.90–9.99 m)		Collins Radio
AN/URC-64	Emergency survival radio operating between 225–285 MHz (1.33–1.05 m)	US Air Force	
AN/URC-68	Emergency survival radio	US Army	
AN/URC-107	Joint Tactical Information Distribution System (JTIDS) multiprocessor controlled radio terminal operating between .960–1.215 GHz (31.23–24.67 cm)	US Marine Corps	BAE
AN/URC-117	Ground Wave Emergency Network (GWEN) command and control radio	US Air Force	

AN/URM – Utility Radio Maintenance/Test Assembly Systems
Designation	Purpose/Description	Location/Used By	Manufacturer
AN/URM-25	Vacuum tube radio frequency (RF) signal generator equipment test set		

AN/URN – Utility Radio Navigational Aids Systems
Designation	Purpose/Description	Location/Used By	Manufacturer
AN/URN-20	Tactical Air Navigation (TACAN) beacon	Virginia-class cruisers	
AN/URN-25	Tactical Air Navigation (TACAN) beacon, replaced the AN/URN-20	US Marine Corps	NavCom Defense Electronics

=== USx – Utility Special/Combination Systems ===
AN/USC – Utility Special/Combination Communications Systems
Designation	Purpose/Description	Location/Used By	Manufacturer
AN/USC-43	Super high frequency (SHF) SATCOM terminal supporting Defense Satellite Communications System (DSCS) links		Raytheon
AN/USC-55	Command Tactical Terminal Three (CTT/H3), Intelligence Broadcast Receiver (IBR) ruggedized UHF satellite communications (SATCOM)	US Marine Corps	Raytheon
AN/USC-61	Multiband, multimode digital modular radio (DMR) supporting UHF, VHF, and SATCOM	Joint services	General Dynamics
AN/USC-62	Joint Tactical Terminal (JTT) UHF tactical intelligence terminal	US Marine Corps	Raytheon
AN/USC-65	Lightweight Multi-band Satellite Terminal (LMST) SHF transportable full-duplex multi-band C/K_{u}-band/X-band satellite communications (SATCOM) ground terminal	US Marine Corps	Harris Corp

AN/USD – Utility Special/Combination Direction Finding/Reconnaissance/Surveillance Systems
Designation	Purpose/Description	Location/Used By	Manufacturer
AN/USD-1	Film surveillance drone	US Army	Radioplane
AN/USD-2	Overseer unmanned aerial vehicle (UAV) surveillance drone	US Army	Aerojet, Rheem Manufacturing Co
AN/USD-3	Snooper unmanned aerial vehicle (UAV) surveillance drone	US Army	Republic Aviation
AN/USD-4	Swallow high speed unmanned aerial vehicle (UAV) surveillance drone	Did not enter service	Republic Aviation
AN/USD-5	Osprey high speed unmanned aerial vehicle (UAV) surveillance drone	Did not enter service	Fairchild Aircraft
AN/USD-9	Improved Guardrail V airborne/ground-based HF/VHF/UHF communications intelligence collection and VHF-only direction finding system	RC-12D Guardrail	
AN/USD-501	CL-89 unmanned aerial vehicle (UAV) surveillance drone		Canadair
AN/USD-502	CL-289 unmanned aerial vehicle (UAV) surveillance drone		Canadair

AN/USQ – Utility Special/Combination Systems
Designation	Purpose/Description	Location/Used By	Manufacturer
AN/USQ-17	Sea-based 30-bit mainframe computer	Naval Tactical Data System	Sperry Univac
AN/USQ-20	Sea-based 30-bit mainframe computer, replaced AN/USQ-17	Naval Tactical Data System	Sperry Univac
AN/USQ-28	Project SKY MAP geodetic survey and photo mapping system	RC-135A	Kollsman Instrument
AN/USQ-46	Portable VHF radio frequency monitor set for Phase III sensor identification and audio transmission	US Marine Corps	Whittaker (now Meggitt)
AN/USQ-66	Central sensor monitor for processing data from field implanted unattended ground sensors	US Marine Corps	
AN/USQ-76	Data terminal set, part of AN/GSQ-235		
AN/USQ-80	Forward Pass interrogator-transponder set provides ground sensor data storage and data relay without the need for continuous real-time monitoring. It operates at the VHF frequency range of 138–153 MHz (2.17–1.96 m) and UHF range of 311–313 MHz (96.40–95.78 cm)	US Marine Corps	
AN/USQ-124	Tactical Intelligence (TACINTEL) for transmission/reception of special intelligence messages over satellite simultaneously screening fleet broadcast messages	US Navy	
AN/USQ-144	Automated Digital Network System (ADNS) for advanced communication backbone capabilities across naval platforms over fleet tactical WAN	US Navy	
AN/USQ-146	Communication Emitter Sensing and Attacking System (CESAS) advanced electronic attack system operating from 20–2,500 MHz (14.99–0.12 m)	US Marine Corps	SPAWAR
AN/USQ-148	SCI Networks communications, networking, command and control system, component of Navy's Multiband Terminal (NMT) program	US Navy	Multiple component vendors
AN/USQ-163	Falconer regional Air Operations Center – Weapon System (AOC-WS) command and control (C^{2}) air and missile defense system-of-systems incorporating many software applications and COTS systems	Al Udeid AB, Davis-Monthan AFB, Joint Base Elmendorf-Richardson, Joint Base Pearl Harbor-Hickam, Osan AB, Tyndall AFB, Ramstein AB	Leidos, Raytheon, SAIC
AN/USQ-176	Joint Network Management System (JNMS) for communications planning and network management with planning, monitoring and reconfiguration, fault management, and security functionality	US Army, US Marine Corps	SAIC
AN/USQ-208	Consolidated Afloat Networks and Enterprise Services (CANES) with virtualized servers and thin clients for coalition networking services	US Navy	

AN/USR – Utility Special/Combination Receiver/Passive Detection Systems
Designation	Purpose/Description	Location/Used By	Manufacturer
AN/USR-1	Airborne surveillance receiver		Watkins-Johnson
AN/USR-10	K_{a}-band Super High Frequency (SHF) satellite communications receiver, part of subsurface/shipboard Global Broadcast System (GBS), replaced AN/SSR-2	Los Angeles-class submarines, Ohio-class submarines, Seawolf-class submarines, Virginia-class submarines, Guided-missile cruisers (CG-class), Guided-missile destroyers (DDG-class)	

=== UXx – Utility Facsimile/Television Systems ===
AN/UXC – Utility Facsimile/Television Communications Systems
Designation	Purpose/Description	Location/Used By	Manufacturer
AN/UXC-7	Lightweight tactical ruggedized digital facsimile machine (Fax)	US Marine Corps	Raytheon
AN/UXC-10	Blackjack self-contained tactical ruggedized multifunction digital facsimile machine (Fax), scanner, printer, and copier	US Marine Corps	Cryptek

=== UYx – Utility Data Processing/Computer Systems ===
AN/UYA – Utility Data Processing/Computer Auxiliary Assembly Systems
Designation	Purpose/Description	Location/Used By	Manufacturer
AN/UYA-1	Tactical display system		
AN/UYA-4	Tactical display system	ASW Ships Command & Control System (ASWSC&CS)	Hughes Aircraft

AN/UYK – Utility Data Processing/Computer Systems
Designation	Purpose/Description	Location/Used By	Manufacturer
AN/UYK-1	Submarine-based computer for Transit US Navy navigation satellite (NAVSAT) location system, also called TRW-130		Ramo-Wooldridge
AN/UYK-3	Sea-based Outstation Processor Unit computer, also called BR-133		Bunker Ramo
AN/UYK-5	Moonbeam UNIVAC 1218(CP-789) 18-bit computer for on-ship logistics management, replaced by AN/UYK-65	Naval Tactical Data System, US Marine Corps Landing Approach System-3	Sperry Univac
AN/UYK-7	32-bit mainframe computer	Naval Tactical Data System, Aegis Combat System, Enhanced Position Location Reporting System	Sperry Univac
AN/UYK-8	30-bit mainframe computer, replaced CP-808 computer	Naval Tactical Data System	Sperry Univac
AN/UYK-11	18-bit missile launch computer	LGM-30 Minuteman	Sperry Univac
AN/UYK-19	Naval electronic warfare computer, also called ROLM 1602		ROLM
AN/UYK-20	Minicomputer, replaced by AN/UYK-44	Naval Tactical Data System, Enhanced Position Location Reporting System	Sperry Univac
AN/UYK-43	32-bit mainframe computer, replaced AN/UYK-7	Naval Tactical Data System, Ohio-class submarines	Unisys
AN/UYK-44	Minicomputer, replaced AN/UYK-20	Naval Tactical Data System, Ohio-class submarines	Sperry Corp
AN/UYK-62	Non-tactical distributed computer automated data processing system based on the Harris series-300 minicomputers, part of Shipboard Non-tactical Automated Data Processing Program (SNAP II)		Harris Corp
AN/UYK-65	Non-tactical distributed computer automated data processing system based on the Honeywell DSP-6 series, part of Shipboard Non-tactical Automated Data Processing Program (SNAP I), replaced AN/UYK-5		Honeywell

AN/UYQ – Utility Data Processing/Computer Special/Combination Systems
Designation	Purpose/Description	Location/Used By	Manufacturer
AN/UYQ-3	Direct Air Support Central, Airborne System (DASC, AS) interfaces with AN/MRQ-12 Communications Interface System (CIS) providing air support while on-board Lockheed Martin KC-130F/R/T aircraft (but not the KC-130J)	US Marine Corps	NSWC Crane
AN/UYQ-4	Direct Air Support Central (DASC)	US Marine Corps	
AN/UYQ-21	Tactical display system		
AN/UYQ-70	Sea-based workstation, replaced AN/UYA-4 and AN/UYQ-21 (series) displays	US Navy	
AN/UYQ-83	Technical Control and Analysis Center Remote Analysis Workstation (TCAC RAWS) portable automated signals intelligence (SIGINT) system	US Marine Corps	
AN/UYQ-91	Intelligence Operations Server (IOS) communication processor, track management, and intelligence database server	US Marine Corps	
AN/UYQ-100	Undersea Warfare Decision Support System (USW-DSS) command and control Link 11/16 and AN/SQQ-89 networking system	US Navy	Leidos

AN/UYS – Utility Data Processing/Computer Detection/Range and Bearing Search Systems
Designation	Purpose/Description	Location/Used By	Manufacturer
AN/UYS-1	Proteus Single Advanced Signal Processor (SASP) sonobuoy signal processor, replaced AN/AQA-7	US Navy	Lockheed Martin, Raytheon
AN/UYS-2	Enhanced Modular Signal Processor (EMSP) for acoustic sonobuoys, used with AN/AQS-22, AN/BSY-2, AN/SQQ-89 and/or AN/UQQ-2, replaced AN/UYS-1	US Navy	Lucent Technologies

AN/:
- Top
- A–G
- M
- P
- S
- T
- U
- V
- W
- Z
- See also
- References
- Bibliography
- Further reading
- External links
- Main list

== V ==
=== VPx – Vehicular Radar Systems ===
AN/VPS – Vehicular Radar Detection/Range and Bearing Search Systems
Designation	Purpose/Description	Location/Used By	Manufacturer
AN/VPS-2	Range-only radar	M163 Vulcan Air Defense System (VADS)	

=== VRx – Vehicular Radio Systems ===
AN/VRC – Vehicular Radio Communications Systems
Designation	Purpose/Description	Location/Used By	Manufacturer
AN/VRC-3	Portable 38.23 lb (17.34 kg) with BA-70 battery vacuum-tube FM half-duplex VHF Signal Corps Radio transceiver operating from 40–48 MHz (7.49–6.25 m) over 40 channels with a 3 mi (4.8 km) range, also known as SCR-300	US Army	Galvin Manufacturing Corp
AN/VRC-5	Variant of the Signal Corps Radio SCR-508 line-of-sight short range (10–15 mi (16–24 km)) vehicular mounted FM radio with separately mounted transmitter and receiver, replaced by AN/VRC-8	US Army	
AN/VRC-8	Short range vehicular FM radio, replaced AN/VRC-5	US Army	
AN/VRC-12	40 watt 100 lb (45 kg) vehicular mounted transistor and vacuum tube based VHF FM synthesized radio operating from 30–76 MHz (9.99–3.94 m) over 920 channels with a range of 30 mi (48 km), replaced AN/GRC-3 through AN/GRC-8, replaced by Single Channel Ground and Airborne Radio System (SINCGARS) family of radios		Avco
AN/VRC-43	Variant of AN/VRC-12 series		Avco
AN/VRC-44	Variant of AN/VRC-12 series		Avco
AN/VRC-45	Variant of AN/VRC-12 series		Avco
AN/VRC-46	Variant of AN/VRC-12 series, used in AN/TSQ-71		Avco
AN/VRC-47	Variant of AN/VRC-12 series		Avco
AN/VRC-48	Variant of AN/VRC-12 series		Avco
AN/VRC-49	Variant of AN/VRC-12 series		Avco
AN/VRC-83	Tactical medium-range vehicular 30 watt VHF (116–149.975 MHz (2.58–2.00 m)) and UHF (225–399.975 MHz (1.33–0.75 m)) radio set	US Marine Corps	Raytheon
AN/VRC-87	VHF 5 watt short range Single Channel Ground and Airborne Radio System (SINCGARS)		
AN/VRC-88	Vehicular mounted VHF (30–87.975 MHz (9.99–3.41 m)) 4 watt short range Single Channel Ground and Airborne Radio System (SINCGARS), replaced the AN/GRC-125 and AN/GRC-160	US Marine Corps	CECOM
AN/VRC-89	Vehicular mounted VHF (30–87.975 MHz (9.99–3.41 m)) 50 watt short/long range Single Channel Ground and Airborne Radio System (SINCGARS)	US Marine Corps	CECOM
AN/VRC-90	Vehicular mounted VHF (30–87.975 MHz (9.99–3.41 m)) 50 watt long range Single Channel Ground and Airborne Radio System (SINCGARS)	US Marine Corps	CECOM
AN/VRC-91	Vehicular mounted VHF (30–87.975 MHz (9.99–3.41 m)) 50 watt short/long range Single Channel Ground and Airborne Radio System (SINCGARS), with man-pack accessories	US Marine Corps	CECOM
AN/VRC-92	Vehicular mounted VHF (30–87.975 MHz (9.99–3.41 m)) 50 watt long range Single Channel Ground and Airborne Radio System (SINCGARS) combat-net radio (CNR)	US Marine Corps	CECOM
AN/VRC-102	Vehicular mounted HF/VHF radio operating from 1.6–60 MHz (187.37–5.00 m)	US Marine Corps	Harris Corp

=== VSx – Vehicular Special/Combination Systems ===
AN/VSN – Vehicular Special/Combination Navigation Systems
Designation	Purpose/Description	Location/Used By	Manufacturer
AN/VSN-12	Fibre-optic gyroscope inertial navigation system using the AN/PSN-11 Precision Lightweight GPS Receiver (PLGR), land navigation version of AN/ZSN-1	US Army	Northrop Grumman

AN/VSQ – Vehicular Special/Combination Systems
Designation	Purpose/Description	Location/Used By	Manufacturer
AN/VSQ-2	Vehicular mounted Enhanced Position Location Reporting System (EPLRS) Data Net Radio for secure connectivity and positional location capabilities	US Army, US Marine Corps	CECOM

AN/:
- Top
- A–G
- M
- P
- S
- T
- U
- V
- W
- Z
- See also
- References
- Bibliography
- Further reading
- External links
- Main list

== W ==
=== WLx – Water Surface and Underwater combined Countermeasures Systems ===
AN/WLD – Water Countermeasures Direction Finding/Reconnaissance/Surveillance Systems
Designation	Purpose/Description	Location/Used By	Manufacturer
AN/WLD-1	Remote Minehunting System (RMS)	Arleigh Burke-class destroyers USS Pinckney (DDG-91), USS Momsen (DDG-92), USS Bainbridge (DDG-96)	Lockheed Martin

AN/WLQ – Water Countermeasures Special/Combined Systems
Designation	Purpose/Description	Location/Used By	Manufacturer
AN/WLQ-4	Sea Nymph submarine Electronic Support Measures (ESM) SIGINT system	Los Angeles-class submarines, Sturgeon-class submarines	

AN/WLR – Water Countermeasures Receiver/Passive Detection Systems
Designation	Purpose/Description	Location/Used By	Manufacturer
AN/WLR-1	Shipboard Over-The-Horizon Cued Detection, Classification and Targeting (OTH Cued DC&T) area surveillance and threat warning ESM system operating from .55–20 GHz (54.51–1.50 cm), capable of tracking up to 300 emitters	US Navy	Sanders Associates
AN/WLR-6	Waterboy VLF/HF/VHF/UHF submarine based electronic intelligence (ELINT)	Los Angeles-class submarines, Skipjack-class submarines, Sturgeon-class submarines	
AN/WLR-8	Shipboard spectrum scan and analysis receiver operating from .05–18 GHz (599.58–1.67 cm)	Kitty Hawk-class aircraft carriers, Lafayette-class submarines, Los Angeles-class submarines, Ohio-class submarines	GTE
AN/WLR-9	Automatic acoustic intercept receiver serving as a passive system to detect and analyze active sonar from other sources, replaced by AN/WLY-1	Los Angeles-class submarines, Seawolf-class submarines, Skipjack-class submarines Virginia-class submarines	
AN/WLR-10	Submarine based radar warning receiver	Lafayette-class submarines, Ohio-class submarines	
AN/WLR-18	Classic Salmon VHF electronic intelligence (ELINT) system	Los Angeles-class submarines	

AN/WLY – Water Countermeasures Surveillance Systems
Designation	Purpose/Description	Location/Used By	Manufacturer
AN/WLY-1	Acoustic threat intercept system (ATIS) with torpedo recognition, classification and tracking capabilities with a control subsystem for launch management of onboard countermeasures	Los Angeles-class submarines, Ohio-class submarines, Seawolf-class submarines, Virginia-class submarines	Northrop Grumman

=== WQx – Water Surface and Underwater combined Sonar Systems ===
AN/WQX – Water Sonar Identification/Recognition Systems
Designation	Purpose/Description	Location/Used By	Manufacturer
AN/WQX-2	Diver detection sonar (DDS)	US Navy's Waterside Security System (WSS)	University of Texas at Austin Applied Research Laboratories

=== WSx – Water Surface and Underwater Special/Combined Systems ===
AN/WSQ – Water Special/Combined Systems
Designation	Purpose/Description	Location/Used By	Manufacturer
AN/WSQ-5	Cluster Spectator higher frequency wide-band electronic intelligence (ELINT) system	Los Angeles-class submarines	
AN/WSQ-7	SHF/EHF Advanced Communications Radio (SEACOM) (Note: Not to be confused with SEACOM (African cable system) and SEACOM (Asian cable system) communication systems, or Rafael Advanced Defense Systems's trademarked SeaCom naval communications suite)	US Navy	
AN/WSQ-11	Tripwire torpedo protection system	US Navy	
AN/WSQ-46	Barracuda untethered expendable semi-autonomous mine neutralization vehicle with a length of 3 feet (0.91 m) and diameter of 5 inches (13 cm)	Still under development as of July 2025	Raytheon

AN/:
- Top
- A–G
- M
- P
- S
- T
- U
- V
- W
- Z
- See also
- References
- Bibliography
- Further reading
- External links
- Main list

== Z ==
=== ZPx – Airborne Vehicle Radar Systems ===
AN/ZPQ – Airborne Vehicle Radar Special/Combination Systems
Designation	Purpose/Description	Location/Used By	Manufacturer
AN/ZPQ-1	Tactical Endurance Synthetic Aperture Radar (TESAR)	C-23 Sherpa, RQ/MQ-1 Predator, other UAVs	Northrop Grumman

AN/ZPY – Airborne Vehicle Radar Surveillance Systems
Designation	Purpose/Description	Location/Used By	Manufacturer
AN/ZPY-1	Gimbal mounted Small Tactical Radar - Lightweight (STARLite) synthetic-aperture radar/Ground Moving Target Indicator (GMTI) with a range of 10 mi (16 km)	MQ-1C Gray Eagle	Northrop Grumman
AN/ZPY-2	Active Electronically Scanned Array (AESA) Multi-Platform Radar Technology Insertion Program (MP-RTIP) X-band long range surveillance radar	RQ-4B Global Hawk	Northrop Grumman
AN/ZPY-3	Long range multi-function active sensor (MFAS) 360° rotating and active electronically scanned array (AESA) maritime and surface search X-band ISAR/SAR radar with a 200 nmi (230 mi; 370 km) range	MQ-4C Triton	Northrop Grumman
AN/ZPY-5	Vehicle and dismount exploitation radar (VADER) AESA pod with GMTI/SAR modes		Northrop Grumman

=== ZSx – Airborne Vehicle Special/Combination Systems ===
AN/ZSN – Airborne Special/Combination Navigation Systems
Designation	Purpose/Description	Location/Used By	Manufacturer
AN/ZSN-1	12.7 lb (5.8 kg) fiber-optic gyroscope inertial navigation system with 12-channel selective availability anti-spoofing module (SAASM) GPS receiver (model LN-251)	CH-53K King Stallion, E-2D Advanced Hawkeye	Northrop Grumman

AN/ZSQ – Water Special/Combination Systems
Designation	Purpose/Description	Location/Used By	Manufacturer
AN/ZSQ-2	Nose mounted forward looking infrared/electro-optical (FLIR/EO) assault/attack sensor	MH-47G Chinook, MH-60M Black Hawk	Raytheon
AN/ZSQ-3	36 lb (16 kg) electro-optical/infrared (EO/IR) sensor turret with stabilized gimbal, mid-wave infrared (MWIR) capability, laser rangefinder/designator	MH-6M Little Bird	Teledyne FLIR

AN/ZSW – Airborne Vehicle Special/Combination Flight/Remote Control Systems
Designation	Purpose/Description	Location/Used By	Manufacturer
AN/ZSW-1	High-bandwidth two-way improved datalink pod (IDLP) for bomb guidance	F-15E Strike Eagle	

AN/:
- Top
- A–G
- M
- P
- S
- T
- U
- V
- W
- Z
- See also
- References
- Bibliography
- Further reading
- External links
- Main list

== See also ==
- Joint Electronics Type Designation System – Unclassified designation system for United States military electronic equipment - The AN/ system defined
- Signal Corps Radio – U.S. Army radio systems
- Category:Military electronics of the United States
- Wikipedia:Stand-alone lists

=== Lists ===
- List of equipment of the United States Armed Forces
- List of equipment of the United States Air Force
- List of equipment of the United States Army
- List of equipment of the United States Coast Guard
- List of equipment of the United States Marine Corps
- List of equipment of the United States Navy
- List of United States radar types
- List of U.S. Signal Corps Vehicles (V-list)
- List of World War II electronic warfare equipment

== Bibliography ==
- Army Science Board (January 1979). Military Operations in Built-Up Areas (MOBA) (PDF) (Report). Washington, D.C.: Office of the Assistant of the Army. DTIC ADB034309. (155 pages)
- Bittencourt, Raul Pereira (June 1976). Electronic warfare technology (PDF) (Electrical Engineer thesis). Monterey, California: Naval Postgraduate School. hdl:10945/17747. DTIC ADA028210. (147 pages)
- Caton, Maj Scott William (August 1980). Landing Force Organizational Systems Study (LFOSS) Annual Report for 1979 (LFOSS-79) (PDF) (Report). Quantico, Virginia: Headquarters, US Marine Corps. DTIC ADA118028. (371 pages)
- DoD (1964). Department of Defense Appropriations for Fiscal Year 1965. Washington, D.C.: United States Government Printing Office. (1,744 pages)
- Fales, David; Lorence, Robert J; Hauptman, Robert; Day, John M; Hesse, George L (May 1967). ECOM-0006-1 High Altitude Radio Relay Systems - Semi-Annual Report (PDF) (Report). Fort Monmouth, New Jersey: US Army Communications-Electronics Command. DTIC AD0659400. (323 pages)
- Hanlon, Edward (1 October 2004). Marine Corps Order 1510.90A Individual Training Standards for Marine Corps Common Skills, Volume II - Corporal through Captain (PDF). Washington, D.C.: Headquarters, US Marine Corps. (379 pages)
- Holler, Roger A (January 2014). The Evolution of the Sonobuoy from World War Ii to the Cold War (U) (PDF). Navmar Applied Sciences Corp. (27 pages)
- JPRS Report (29 December 1987). Soviet Union, Foreign Military Review, No. 6 (PDF) (Report). Arlington, Virginia: Joint Publications Research Service. DTIC ADA348280. (53 pages)
- JPRS Report (10 May 1988). Soviet Union, Foreign Military Review, No. 11 (PDF) (Report). Arlington, Virginia: Joint Publications Research Service. DTIC ADA347206. (48 pages)
- Kleinschmidt (February 1970). Military Telecommunications Equipment (PDF) (Product Catalog). Deerfield, Illinois: Kleinschmidt. (61 pages)
- McMican, LCDR William J; Richards, LCDR James J (March 1985). Shipboard Non-Tactical Computer Systems of the US Navy (PDF) (Master of Science in Information Systems thesis). Monterey, California: Naval Postgraduate School. DTIC ADA156769. (129 pages)
- MIL-HDBK-162A (15 December 1965). "Radar Equipment". TM 11-487C-1 Military Standardization Handbook United States (PDF) (Technical Manual). Vol. 1. Washington, D.C.: Headquarters, Department of the Army. (1,531 pages)
- NAVPERS (1969). NAVPERS-10794-C Shipboard Electronic Equipments (PDF) (Report). Washington, D.C.: Bureau of Naval Personnel. (232 pages)
- Petterson, Göran Sven Erik (September 1993). An illustrated overview of ESM and ECM systems (PDF). CORE (Master of Science in Systems Engineering thesis). Naval Postgraduate School. p. 85. (145 pages)
- Shyu, Heidi (2012). "Clip-on Sniper Night Sight (SNS)". Weapon Systems 2012 - America's Army: The Strength of the Nation (PDF). US Army. (384 pages)
- Travis, Maj Kenneth L (12 May 1988). The Integration of US Army Electronic Warfare Capabilities in J-SEAD Operations (PDF) (Report). Maxwell AFB, Alabama: Air Command and Staff College, Air University. DTIC ADA192616. (44 pages)
- Wahl, Katrina G; Riordan, James L (30 December 2005). TM 2000-OD/2C Principal Technical Characteristics of US Marine Corps Communication-Electronics Equipment (PDF) (Technical Manual). Quantico, Virginia: US Marine Corps. (364 pages)
