= AN/MSR-T4 =

Radar system

The AN/MSR-T4 Threat Reaction Analysis Indicator System (TRAINS) is a radar receiver/data processing system to evaluate training performance of attack aircraft crews of the United States Air Force. TRAINS evaluated the crew's Electronic Countermeasures (ECM) against air defense radar by analyzing "the accuracy and effectiveness of inflight ECM performance for combat aircraft ECM pods and internal ECM suite". It captured, recorded, and analyzed transmissions (e.g., jamming against a ground radar) from aircraft responding to threats simulated by the US Dynamics AN/MST-T1 Multiple Threat Emitter Simulator (MUTES) to which the TRAINS was slaved for pointing toward the aircraft. TRAINS data identified the EWO's actions, response times, etc.; and the system included a VHF/UHF receiver and training set.

TRAINS was developed under Electronic Systems Division program 806L after the 1991 Gulf War which identified electronic warfare "shortfalls" and was funded for overhaul in 1999 (Defense Systems Inc.added narrowband receivers to the system in 2006.) In 1976, an MSQ-T4 [sic] was proposed as an "emitter" in the General Dynamics range design (Range Instrumentation System) for the electronic threat environment at the Hill/Westover/Dugway Ranges ("AFLC Test Range Complex"), and a TRAINS was at the Smoky Hill Air National Guard Range c. 2003.

In accordance with the Joint Electronics Type Designation System (JETDS), the "AN/MSR-T4" designation represents the 4th design of an Army-Navy electronic device for ground mobile special receiver training equipment. The JETDS system also now is used to name all Department of Defense electronic systems.

== See also ==
- List of military electronics of the United States
- Joint Electronics Type Designation System – Unclassified designation system for United States military electronic equipment
