= AN/MSQ-18 Battalion Missile Operations System =

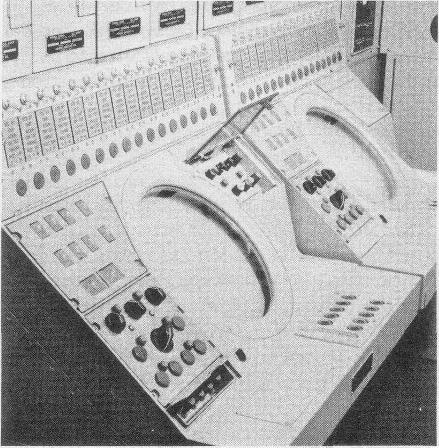
Control console

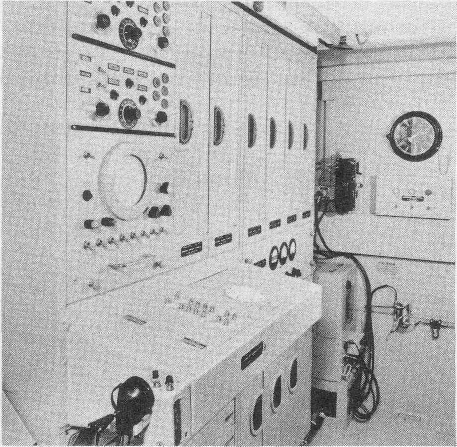
Test panel in CDG

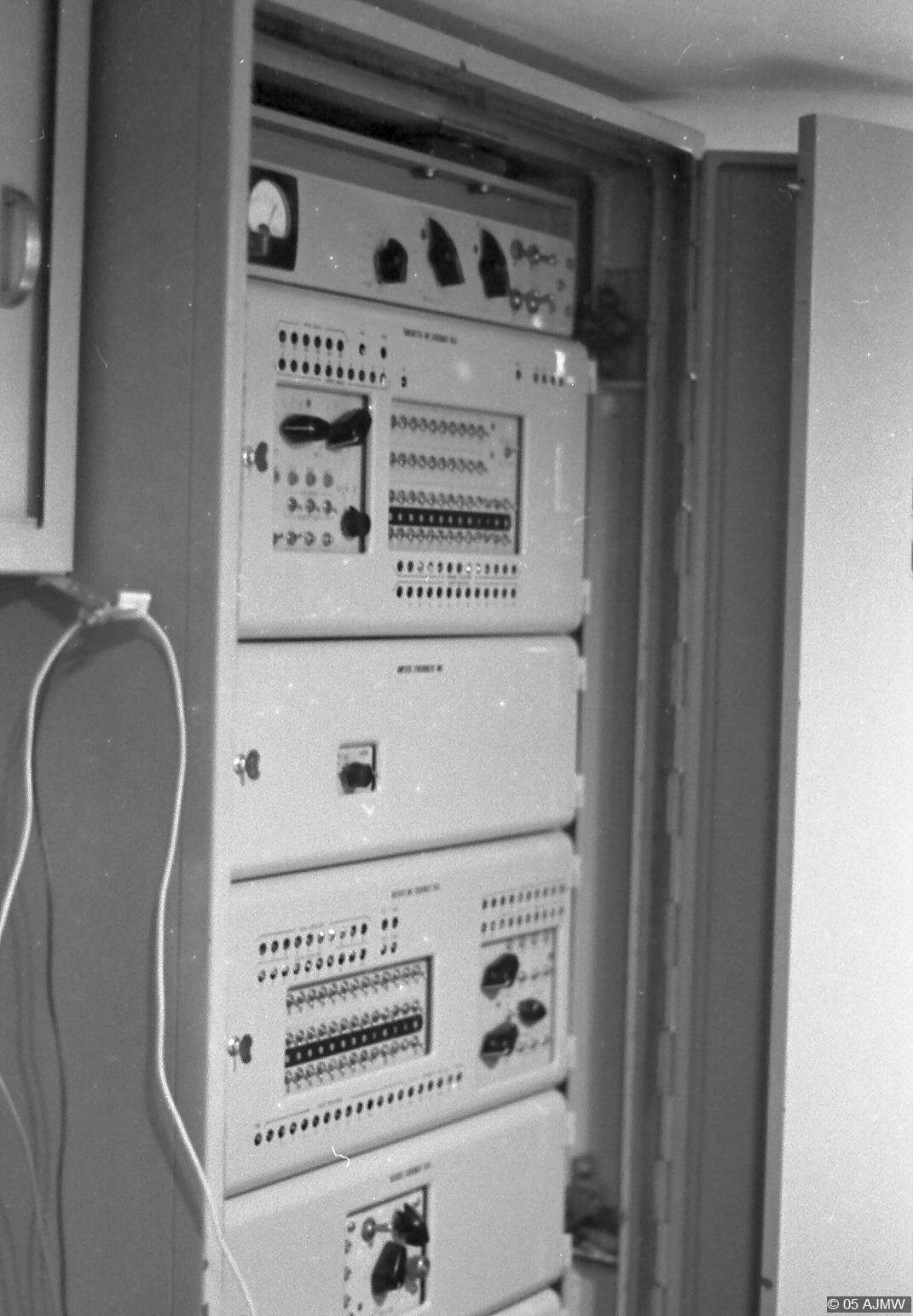
Digital computer of CDG (TSQ-38)

The Raytheon AN/MSQ-18 Battalion Missile Operations System (AN/TSQ-38 for the helicopter-transportable variant) was a Project Nike command, control, and coordination system for "each associated missile battery" to control a Nike missile as directed from a Raytheon AN/MSQ-28 at the Army Air Defense Command Post. Raytheon Company constructed the AN/MSQ-18 as 2 separate subsystems:

- the AN/MSQ-18's operations central in a trailer van with 2 "Surveillance and Entry Consoles" and serving as "the tactical command post of the air defense battalion ... capable of either monitoring the engagement or actually making assignments of targets to its batteries", and
- the AN/MSQ-18's coder-decoder group (CDG) as the trailer van at each battery to "decode the digital data coming to the battery [for use] by the guided missile system."

In accordance with the Joint Electronics Type Designation System (JETDS), the "AN/MSQ-18" designation represents the 18th design of an Army-Navy electronic device for ground mobile special combination equipment. The JETDS system also now is used to name all Department of Defense electronic systems.

== See also ==
- List of military electronics of the United States
