= AN/PVS-5 =

US military dual-tube night-vision goggle

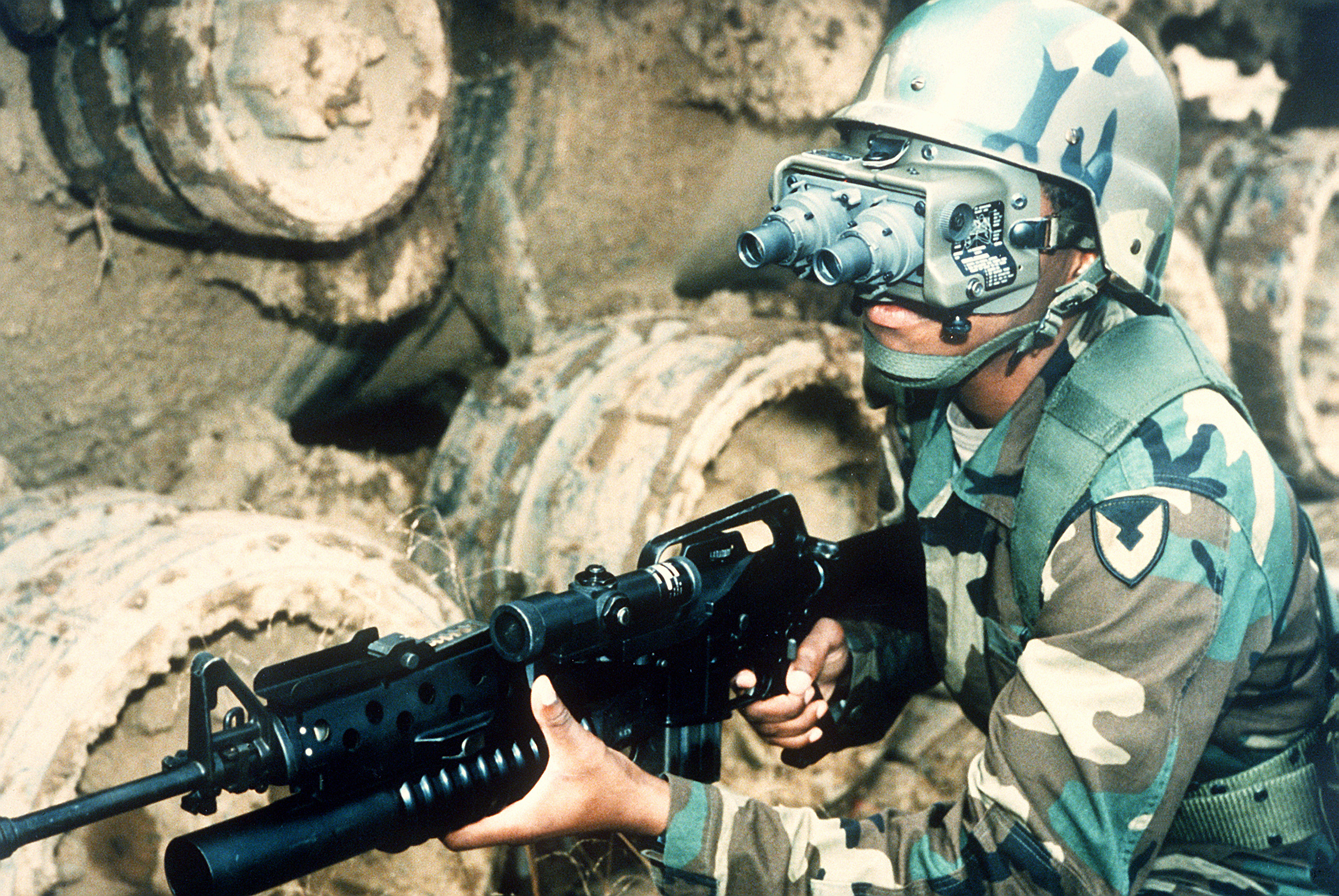
- AN/PVS-5A night vision goggle worn by a US soldier in 1988.
- Type: Passive
- Place of origin: United States
- Category: Head/helmet mountable

Service history
- In service: 1972–present
- Used by: United States Armed Forces
- Wars: Vietnam War; Operation Eagle Claw; Persian Gulf War; War in Afghanistan; Iraq War

Production history
- Designed: 1971
- Manufacturer: ITT Industries; Litton Industries
- Variants: AN/PVS-5, AN/PVS-5A, AN/PVS-5B, AN/PVS-5C

Specifications
- Weight: 850 grams
- Dimensions (L×H×W): 6.5" x 6.8" x 4.7"
- Resolution (lp/mm): >32 lp/mm
- Mode of Operation: Passive
- II tube: MX-9916
- Field of vision (°): 40 degrees
- Range of detection: 50m (Starlight) 150m (Moonlight)
- System zoom: 1×
- Generation: 2

The AN/PVS-5 is a dual-tube night-vision goggle used for aviation and ground support. It uses second-generation image-intensifier tubes. The United States Army still has PVS-5 on supply but are very rarely used. The AN/PVS-5 is based on the SU-50 which was a first-generation night-vision goggle adapted by the United States Air Force in 1971. From 1972 until 1990 the AN/PVS-5 was the mainstay in US Army night vision for aviation. The AN/PVS-5C was not approved for flight because of its high-light cut off feature causing the goggle to shut off in bright light. For ground troops the AN/PVS-5 was the sole night-vision goggle until the adaptation of the improved AN/PVS-7.

By today's standards, the PVS-5 was a safety risk for pilots. Issues such as a limited field of view, poor light amplification, inability to read maps, and its excessive weight made it difficult to fly while operating them. In 1982, tests were being made for a suitable replacement for the AN/PVS-5 specifically for aviation. This led to the adaptation of the AN/AVS-6 ANVIS in 1989. The ANVIS was the first night-vision goggle used by the United States Army specifically designed for aviation.

In accordance with the Joint Electronics Type Designation System (JETDS), the "AN/PVS-5" designation represents the 5th design of an Army-Navy electronic device for portable visual detection equipment. The JETDS system also now is used to name all Department of Defense electronic systems.

== History ==
Photographic evidence from Operation Eagle Claw shows US military personnel at staging area Desert One in Iran using in the AN/PVS-5 NVGs.

== See also ==
- List of military electronics of the United States
