= AN/PRC-10 =

Portable radio transceiver

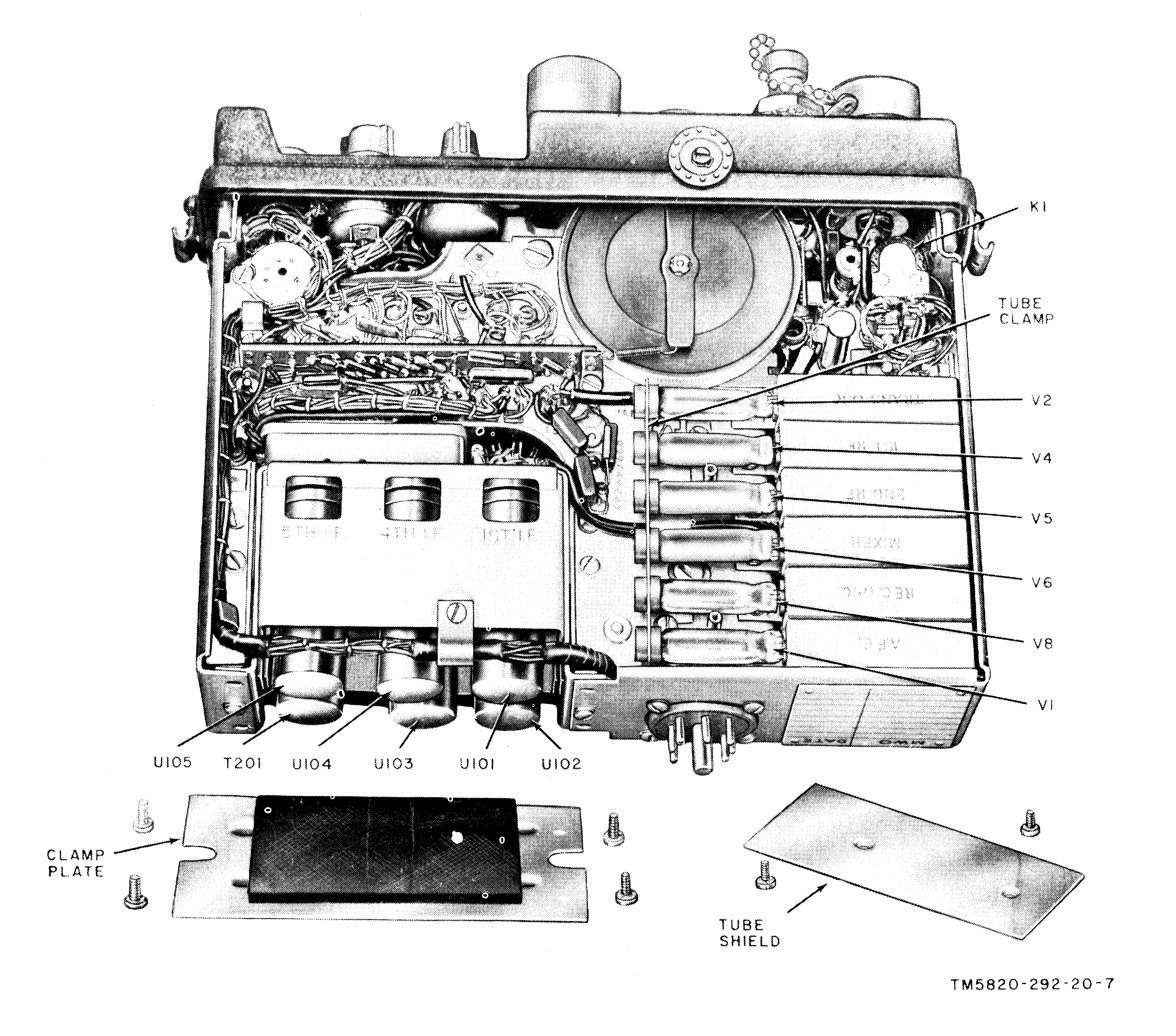
Diagramme of PRC-10

The AN/PRC-10 is an American VHF portable radio transceiver, introduced in 1951 as a replacement for the wartime SCR-300 set. The AN/PRC-8 and AN/PRC-9 sets are basically the same but cover lower frequency bands. It remained in service with the American military until the mid 1960s when it was replaced by the transistorized AN/PRC-25 set.

In accordance with the Joint Electronics Type Designation System (JETDS), the "AN/PRC-10" designation represents the 10th design of an Army-Navy electronic device for portable two-way communications radio. The JETDS system also now is used to name all Department of Defense electronic systems.

== Technical specifications ==
- FM, superheterodyne radio transceiver
- Frequency coverage:
  - AN/PRC-10: 38.0 to 54.9 MHz VHF version used by infantry
  - AN/PRC-9: 27.0 to 38.9 MHz HF/VHF version used by artillery
  - AN/PRC-8: 20.0 to 27.9 MHz HF band version used by armoured units
- Tuning: Single calibrated dial mechanically tunes both receiver and transmitter simultaneously via ganged variable capacitors
- Receiver sensitivity: 0.7 μV
- Receiver selectivity: 80 kHz @ −6 dB
- Intermediate frequency: 4.3 MHz
- Transmitter RF output: 0.9 watts
- Circuitry: 16 vacuum tubes
- Dimensions: 10.4" × 3" × 18.5" including battery compartment
- Weight: 26 pounds including battery pack and accessories
- Power supply options:
  - BA-279/U dry battery providing 1.5, 6, 67.5 and 135 volts
  - AM-598 PSU and amplifier operating from a 24-volt vehicle supply
- Antenna systems:
  - Short: 3-foot AT-272, folding steel tape whip
  - Long: 10-foot AT-271, collapsible 7 section fishing pole whip joined by an internal stainless steel cable
  - External: 50-ohm BNC connector
- Built in crystal calibrator

== See also ==
- List of military electronics of the United States
