= AN/PRC-127 =

Handheld VHF radio transceiver

In military radio communications, the AN/PRC-127 (RT-1594) Radio is a handheld transceiver operating in the 136-160 MHz range used by the US Army to aid in provisioning services, and other non-combat uses. It is a software modified version of the civilian LPI series high band Bendix-King radio. The PRC-127 radio was initially manufactured in Lawrence, Kansas, USA from 1989 on by the Bendix-King Corporation, the updated Version PRC-127A from 1996 on by Bendix-King (now a division of Relm Wireless). The final version of this radio is the model AN/PRC-127EFJ, made by E.F. Johnson Technologies, which is a completely different radio.

In accordance with the Joint Electronics Type Designation System (JETDS), the "AN/PRC-127" designation represents the 127th design of an Army-Navy electronic device for portable two-way communications radio. The JETDS system also now is used to name all Department of Defense electronic systems.

Technical data:

- Weight: 3.25 pounds (1.47 kg)
- Channels:
  - PRC-127: 14 in 1 memory bank
  - PRC-127A: 28 in 2 memory banks; one wideband (25 kHz), one narrowband (12.5 kHz)
- Channel spacing: 25 kHz (PRC-127) / 25 kHz + 12.5 kHz (PRC-127A)
- Frequency control: Synthesizer
- Modulation: FM
- HF Output power: 2 Watts (PRC-127) / 3 Watts (PRC-127A)
- Sensitivity: 0.25 μV
- Power supply: AA cells or NiCad- batteries.
- Specialities: Lid covers keyboard. An extra speaker/mike can be used as well as the VOX/PTT adapter used by special forces units.

== See also ==
- List of military electronics of the United States
