= AN/PEQ-5 =

Laser sight

The AN/PEQ-5, also known as the 'Carbine Visible Laser (CVL)', is a laser sight manufactured by Insight Technology.

In accordance with the Joint Electronics Type Designation System (JETDS), the "AN/PEQ-5" designation represents the 5th design of an Army-Navy electronic device for portable laser combination equipment. The JETDS system also now is used to name all Department of Defense electronic systems.

== Overview ==
The sight is mil-spec and projects a visible red dot. The unit is the Carbine Visible Laser or CVL version of the larger AN/PEQ-2, and is found in the SOPMOD Block I kit for use by the U.S. military. The unit comprises a single rugged box that houses a visible red laser, which mounts to a weapon using a MIL-STD-1913 rail. The one major difference between the PEQ-5 and the larger PEQ-2, is the PEQ-5 lacks the IR illuminator/target designator which is only visible through night vision devices. This feature is primarily used to aid with aiming while using night vision. Both are products of Insight Technologies.

== See also ==
- AN/PEQ-6
- AN/PEQ-15
- AN/PEQ-16
- List of military electronics of the United States
- Joint Electronics Type Designation System – Unclassified designation system for United States military electronic equipment
