= SOPMOD =

Set of weapon accessories

- Type: Firearms Accessory
- Place of origin: United States

The Special Operations Peculiar MODification (SOPMOD) kit is an accessory system for the M4A1 carbine, CQBR, FN SCAR Mk 16/17, HK416 and other weapons used by United States Special Operations Command (USSOCOM) special forces units, though it is not specific to USSOCOM. The kit allows US special operations forces (SOF) personnel to configure their weapons to individual preferences and customize for different mission requirements.

The SOPMOD kit is composed mostly of non-developmental items and commercial off-the-shelf (NDI/COTS) accessories packaged together to support four M4A1 carbines. It allows for the attachment of any Picatinny compatible accessory that fits the length of the weapon.

== History ==
The program dates back to September 1989, when the Special Operations Special Technology (SOST) Modular Close Combat Carbine Project was founded. This was the first program to standardize components from the 1970s/1980s era of "duct tape and hose clamps". The Material Need Statement (MNS) was signed in May 1992 and, by September 1993, the Operational Requirements Document (ORD) for the program was validated. Responsibility for the program was then assigned to the Naval Surface Warfare Center Crane Division.

== Block I ==
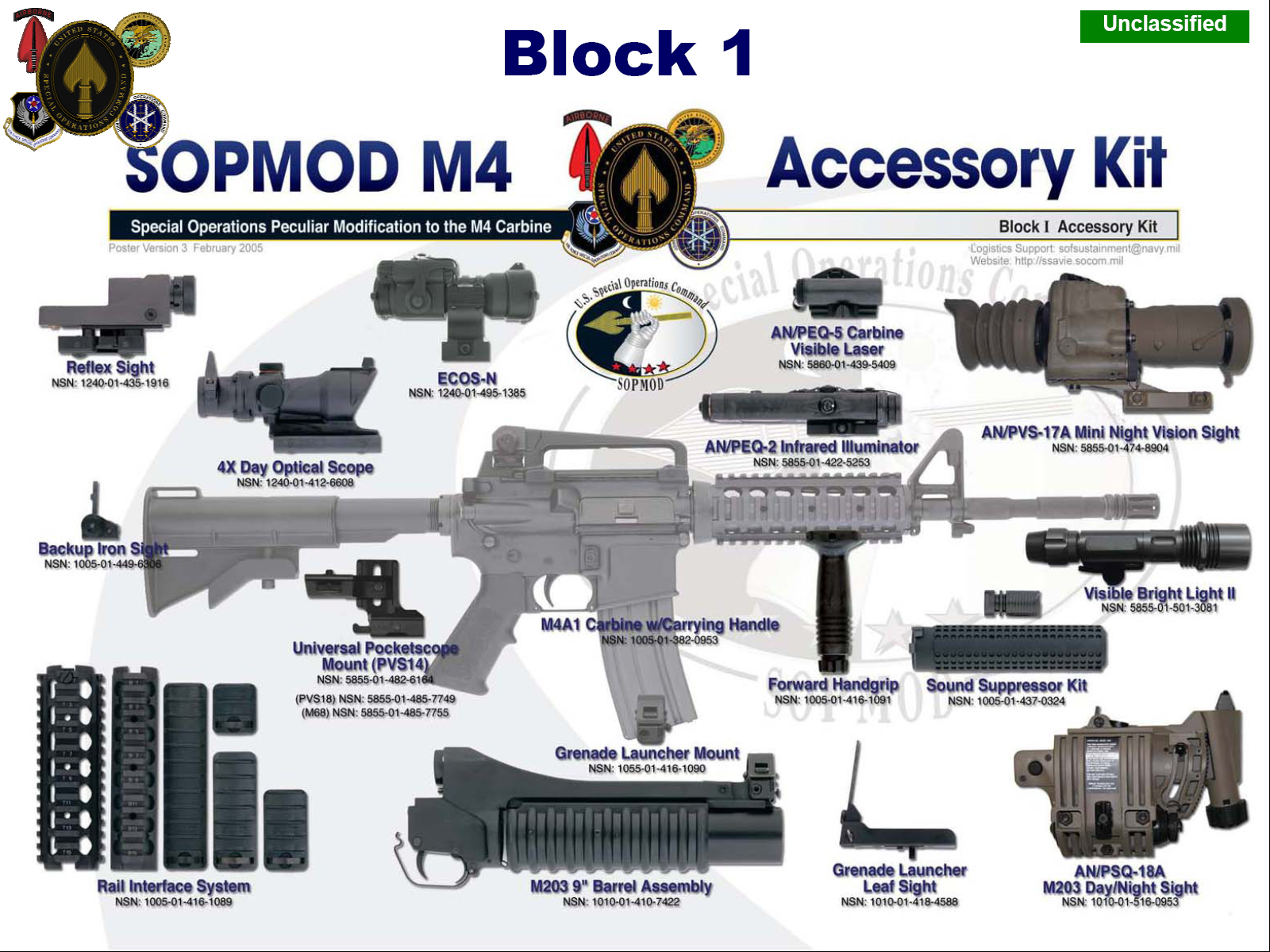
Graphic displaying SOPMOD Block I components

The original SOPMOD Block I kit included the following:

- Knight's Armament Company (KAC) Rail Interface System/Rail Adapter System (RIS/RAS) forearm with rail covers of various lengths.
- KAC Vertical Foregrip (VFG)
- KAC 300m backup iron sights (BUIS)
- Trijicon TA01M4A1 4x32mm Advanced Combat Optical Gunsight (ACOG)
- Aimpoint ECOS-N (Enhanced Combat Optical Sight-Navy), a variant of the CompM2 using the Wilcox Aimpoint CompM mount instead of the standard issue QRP mount
- Tactical Ordnance and Equipment Improved Combat Sling, which allows for secure cross body/patrol carry.
- Precision Reflex, Inc. (PRI) M69 Bracket Mount for the AN/PVS-14 night vision device.

Only two of following were included per kit:

- Insight AN/PEQ-2 Infrared Target Pointer/Illuminator/Aiming Laser (ITPIAL)
- Insight Visible Light Illuminator (VLI)
- Trijicon RX01M4A1 1x24 Dual Illuminated Reflex Sight
- KAC NT-4 Quick-Detach Sound Suppressor (QDSS) kit

Only one of the following was included per kit:

- M203A1 Grenade Launcher with a 9-inch barrel
- KAC M203 Grenade Launcher Quick Release Front Bracket
- Quick-attach M203 Grenade Launcher Leaf Sight
- Insight AN/PEQ-5 Carbine Visible Laser (CVL)
- Insight AN/PAQ-4 Infrared Aiming Light
- AN/PVS-17A Mini- Night Vision Sight
- AN/PSQ-18A M203 Day/Night Sight
- Carrying/storage case for kit accessories

Part of the SOPMOD Block I (but not always issued with kits):

- Gas-deflecting charging handles (presumably the PRI M84 Gas Buster Charging Handle with Military Big Latch)
- Extraction Parts Set #2
- Redi-Mag
- Lewis Machine and Tool Company (LMT) / B5 Systems Sloping Cheekweld Stock
- Ambidextrous Selector Switch
- Visible Bright Light II (VBL II) (based on the older gen Surefire M962C model, replacement for the Insight VLI)
- High Reliability Magazines (HRM) steel and aluminum

If more of the accessories are needed, it is typical for units to "cannibalize" the kits of inactive teams. The documentation for the kit does not require a rewrite if improved replacements for any of the current items can be found. As a result, this content list has changed over time. Several potential additions include the KAC Masterkey Shotgun, the M26 Modular Accessory Shotgun System, and the M320 grenade launcher. Also, various EOTech holographic sights, prominently EOTech 551s and 552s are used on many SOPMOD configured M4s.

=== Phased replacement components ===
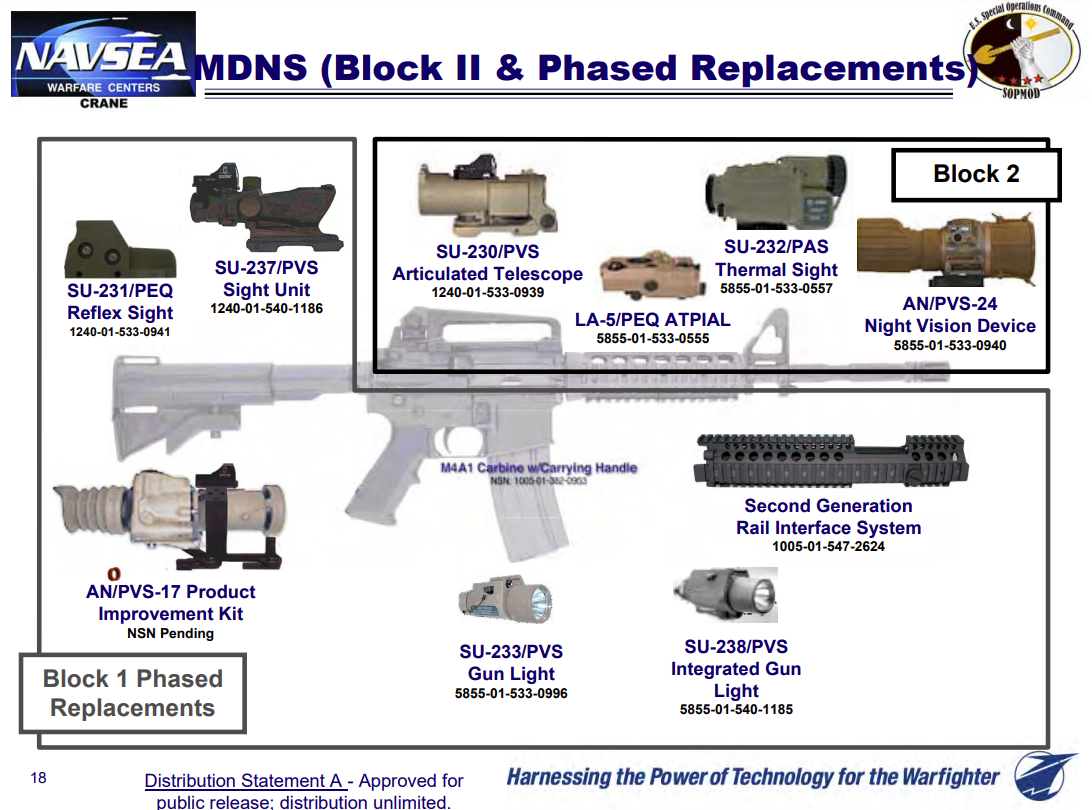
Graphic displaying SOPMOD Block I replacement components and some SOPMOD Block II components

- Daniel Defense M4A1 RIS II (Rail Interface System), GL/SSC RIS II (Grenade Launcher/Sound Suppressor Capable), and MK18 RIS II (with FSP (front sight post) variations) free-float handguards
- Insight M3X VBL III Gun Light (SU-233/PVS), replacement for the VBL II
- Insight M6X VBL III Integrated Gun Light (SU-238/PVS), replacement for the VBL II
- EOTech 553 Holographic Weapon Sight (SU-231/PEQ)
- Trijicon ACOG TA31ECOS 4x Scope + Docter Miniature Red Dot (MRD) (SU-237/PVS)
- AN/PVS-17 Product Improvement Kit
- BUIS II

== Block II ==
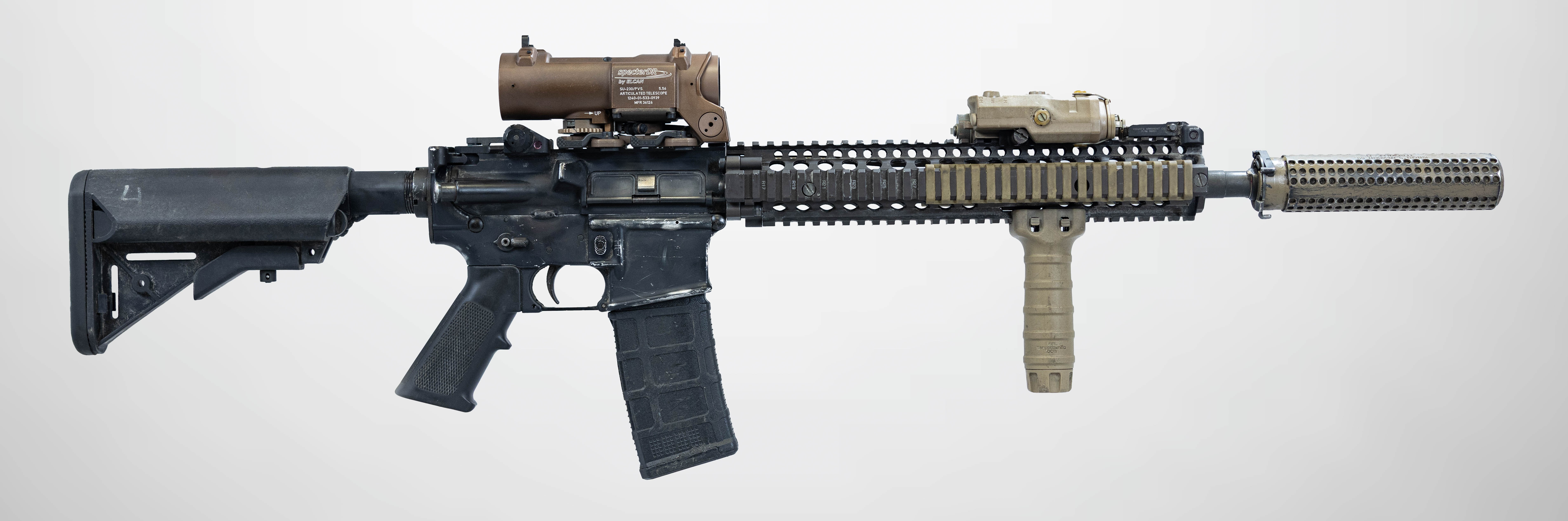
SOPMOD Block II

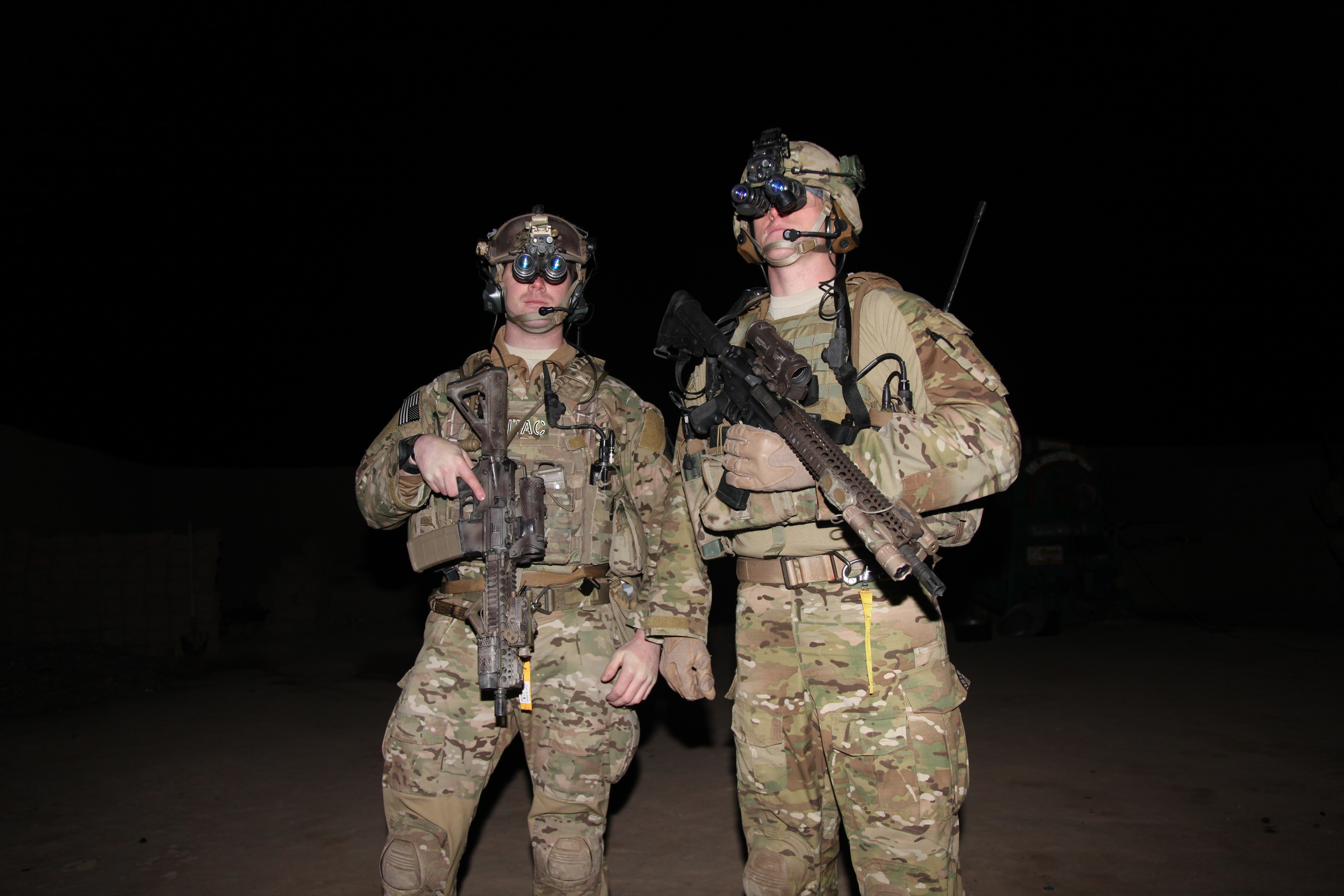
US Army 75th Rangers using multiple Block II accessories on their rifles at night. Note the Insight WMX 200 light mounted on the rifle of the operator on the right.

The MDNS (Miniature Day-Night Sight) program included the Block I Phased Replacement components and the Block II components

- Daniel Defense M4A1 RIS II (Rail Interface System), GL/SSC RIS II (Grenade Launcher/Sound Suppressor Capable), and MK18 RIS II (with FSP (front sight post) variations) free-float handguards
- Insight M3X VBL III Gun Light (SU-233/PVS), replacement for the VBL II
- Insight M6X VBL III Integrated Gun Light (SU-238/PVS), replacement for the VBL II
- Insight WMX 200 Tactical Weapon Light
- EOTech 553 Holographic Weapon Sight (SU-231/PEQ)
- EOTech EXPS3-0 Holographic Weapon Sight (SU-231A/PEQ)
- AN/PVS-17 Product Improvement Kit
- BUIS II
- Insight LA-5C/PEQ ATPIAL (Advanced Target Pointer Illuminator Aiming Laser), an ultra high-powered variant of the AN/PEQ-15
- Insight CNVD-T Thermal Sight (SU-232/PAS)
- EOTech M40GL Grenade Launcher Sight (SU-253/PEQ ECOS-GL)
- Elcan SpecterDR 1-4x Scope + Docter MRD (SU-230/PVS)
- Trijicon ACOG TA31ECOS 4x Scope + Docter MRD (SU-237/PVS)
- Insight AN/PVS-24 Clip-On Night Vision Device-Image Intensified (CVND-I^{2})
