= AN/PEQ-15 =

Multifunction weapon mounted IR laser aiming module

ATPIAL AN/PEQ-15
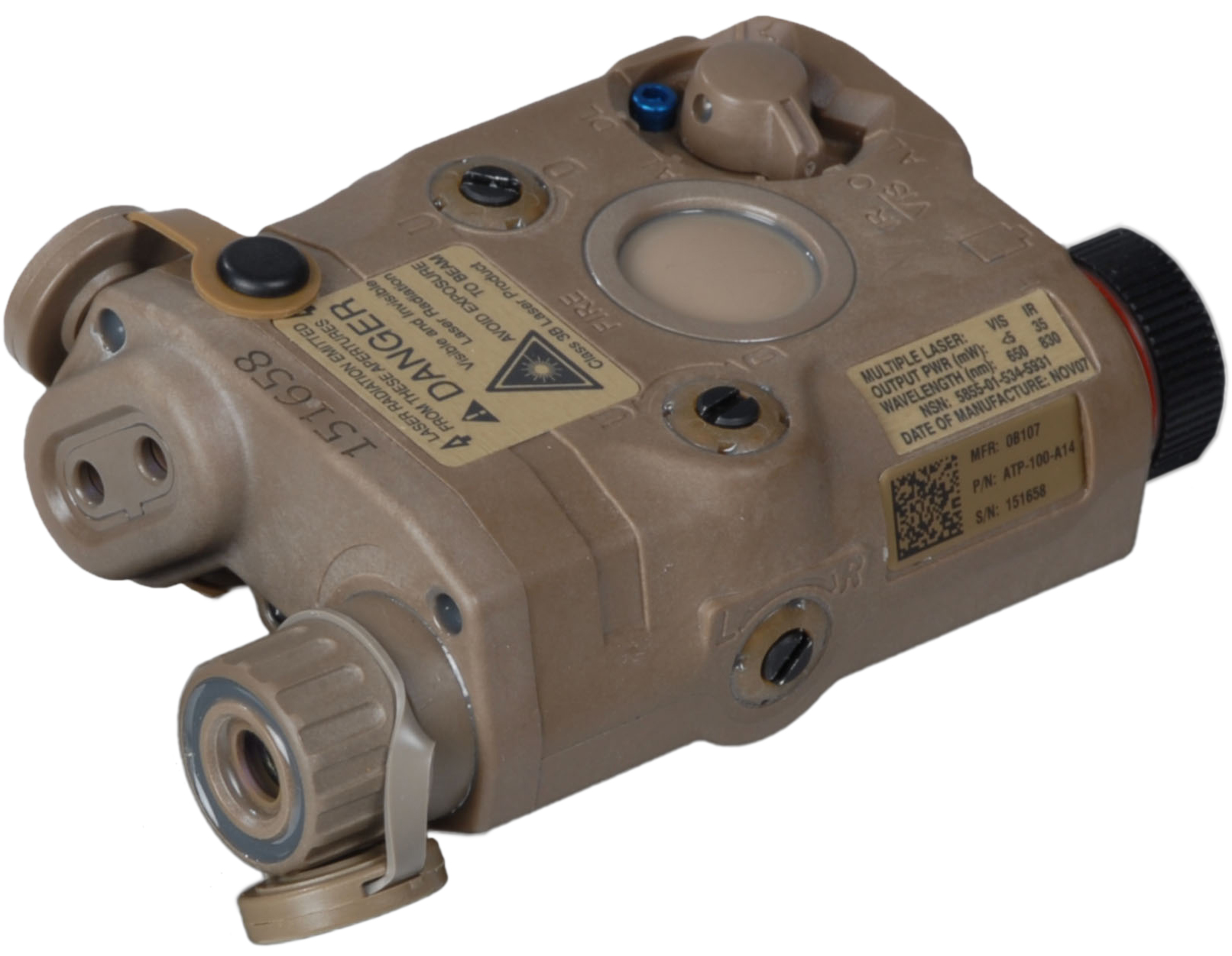
- The ATPIAL (AN/PEQ-15) can be mounted to a firearm.
- Function(s): Infrared target laser and illuminator

Service history
- In service: 2003–present
- Used by: United States; Australia; New Zealand; United Kingdom; Israel
- Wars: War on terror; Gaza war; Russo-Ukrainian War

Production history
- Designer: Insight Technology
- Manufacturer: L3Harris
- NSN: 5855-01-577-7174 (tan); 5855-01-534-5931 (black)
- Unit cost: ~$2,000 USD
- Variants: ATPIAL AN/PEQ-15; HP LA-5B/PEQ; UHP LA-5C/PEQ; AN/PEQ-15A DBAL-A2

General Specifications
- Dimensions (L×H×W): 120 mm (4.6 in) x 71 mm (2.8 in) x 41 mm (1.6 in)
- Weight: 213 g (7.5 oz)

IR Laser Specifications
- IR Laser Class: IIIR (Low), IIIB (High)
- IR Laser Output (mw): Low: 0.7 mW; High: 27.5 mW
- IR Laser Divergence (mrad): 0.5 mrad
- IR Laser Wavelength (nm): (835 ± 15 nm)
- IR Laser Range (m): Low: >600 m (1,969 ft); High: 2,000 m (6,562 ft)

Visible Laser Specifications
- Visible Laser Class: IIIB
- Visible Laser Output (mw): 5 mW
- Visible Laser Divergence (mrad): 0.5 mrad
- Visible Laser Wavelength (nm): (635 ± 15 nm)
- Visible Laser Range (m): >25 m (82 ft) in direct sun

IR Illuminator Specifications
- IR Illuminator Class: IIIB
- IR Illuminator Output (mw): Low: 3.5 mW; High: 45mW
- IR Illuminator Divergence (mrad): 1–105 mrad (Adjustable lens)
- IR Illuminator Wavelength (nm): (835 ± 15 nm)
- IR Illuminator Range (m): Low: >600 m (1,969 ft); High: 2,000 m (6,562 ft)

The Advanced Target Pointer Illuminator Aiming Laser (ATPIAL AN/PEQ-15), known colloquially as the "PEQ-15" [/pɛk//fɪftiːn/], produced by L3Harris (originally designed and manufactured by Insight Technology until their acquisition by L3Harris in 2010), is a multi-function infrared target pointer and illuminator (i.e. a laser aiming module [LAM]) for use on firearms via a Picatinny rail mounting system.

In accordance with the Joint Electronics Type Designation System (JETDS), the "AN/PEQ-15" designation represents the 15th design of an Army-Navy electronic device for portable laser combination equipment. The JETDS system also now is used to name all Department of Defense electronic systems.

The PEQ-15 was brought into service in 2003 during the global war on terrorism. The PEQ-15 is the most widely used LAM on the market, having been the standard issue for American regular forces, and still the standard issue for US Army and the SOPMOD kit, however some military units are moving to the new L3Harris AN/PEQ-16; with the United States Marine Corps adopting the PEQ-16 with the adoption of the M27 Infantry Automatic Rifle, and even more advanced LAMs being fielded by others, including the Australian Army that began moving to PEQ-16's in 2016 and supplementing infantry squads with the L3Harris Squad Rangefinder (SRF).

== Development ==
The ATPIAL AN/PEQ-15 is a multifunctional laser aiming module that emits both visible and IR laser light for precise weapon aiming and produces IR light with an Illuminator for target/area illumination. The module can be used as a handheld illuminator/pointer or can be mounted to weapons equipped with a MIL-STD-1913 (Picatinny Rail) rail mounting system, using the integrated M1913 rail grabber moulded into the body of the unit, eliminating the need for separate mounting hardware.

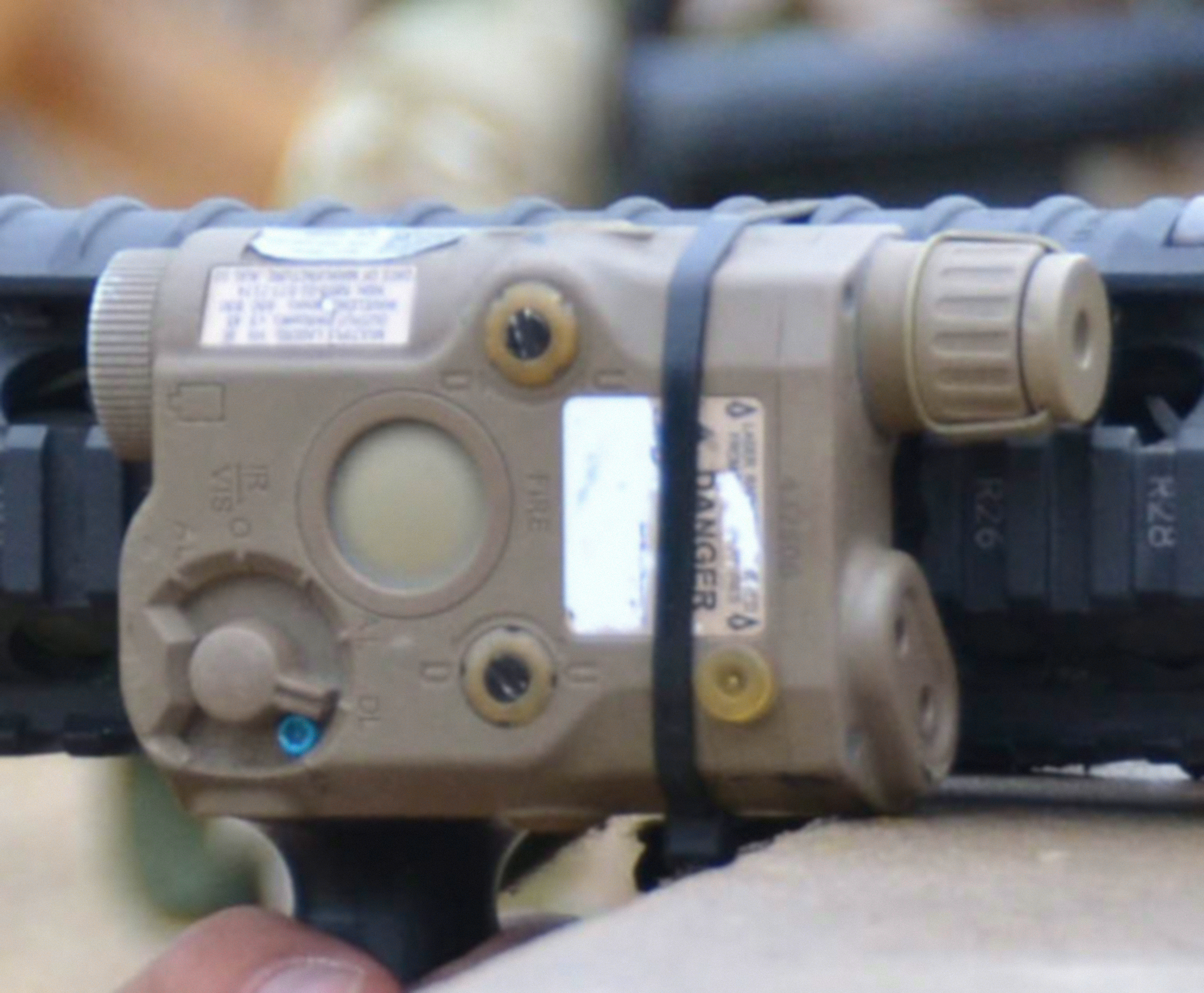
An ATPIAL AN/PEQ-15 attached to the barrel shroud of a Bushmaster M4 set to the Dual Low (DL) setting, for low power IR Laser and Illum. (circa 2014)

=== History ===
Developed and brought into service in 2003 by Insight Technology, the AN/PEQ-15 was being adopted and issued to replace the PEQ-2. The AN/PEQ-2 was first developed in the early 1990s, also by Insight Technology, and became the first widely issued LAM (laser aiming module), of the US military, and other countries' ground forces. The expansion of the GWOT through the early 2000s quickly ballooned the defense budget of many nations, leading to an explosion in contracts for new technology being granted by the US government, including, an updated LAM and replacement for the AN/PEQ-2 being one such contract.

Since its development the PEQ-15 is still the standard issue LAM for military units worldwide, nearly 20 years later. With hundreds of thousands of PEQ-15s in DoD (Department of Defense) inventory, they have since been adopted by Police and other Law Enforcement units across the United States, with the PEQ-15 becoming the most widely issued and battle tested laser aiming modules on the market. The successor to the PEQ-15, the AN/PEQ-16 is fast becoming popular among special forces and regular units around the world. The United States Marine Corps has shifted to the PEQ-16 with the change in rifle to H&K M27 IAR, as a standard attachment for all riflemen. The Australian Army has begun replacing their PEQ-15s with the updated PEQ-16, as the standard LAM to be fitted to the EF-88's extensive picatinny rails.

A 'high power' and 'ultra high power' variant of the PEQ-15 was developed with the latter, the UHP LA-5C/PEQ becoming part of the SOPMOD Block II kit for SOF (Special Operations Forces) Weapon systems. SOF have also now begun to move to the L3 Harris NGAL (Next Generation Aiming Laser) in conjunction with the Enhanced Night Vision Goggle-Binocular (ENVG-B).

=== Restrictions on sale ===
Full power L3 Harris ATPIAL IR Lasers are restricted to Law Enforcement and Government customers only and cannot be sold to civilians. Sale and Purchase of IR Laser equipment can only occur at the department, agency, or unit level, and cannot be sold to individual Law Enforcement, Military, Government, or Contractor personnel due to the Class III IR laser and illuminator. The AN/PEQ-15 is ITAR restricted and its export outside of the United States is strictly prohibited without a valid export license, prescribed in the International Traffic in Arms Regulation (ITAR).

A lower powered "eye safe" model is available for sale to private citizens with a Class I IR laser and fixed focus illuminator as the ATPIAL-C.

== Design details ==
The Advanced Target Pointer/ Illuminator/ Aiming Light (ATPIAL) AN/PEQ-15 was designed and built as the next generation weapon-mountable IR laser/Illuminator after the AN/PEQ-2 and PEQ-4, and in 2003 it became the battlefield replacement for the AN/PEQ-2A which served US Military Forces and Law Enforcement Agencies for many years. The PEQ-15 is almost half the weight and size of its predecessor with the added functionality of a visible laser. The addition of the co-aligned and slaved visible laser is one of the key improvements of the ATPIAL over the PEQ-2, allowing for use without night vision devices. Because the lasers are co-aligned, the PEQ-15 has a single set of adjustment screws for windage and elevation, when zeroing one laser, it zeros both visible and IR. The addition of the visible laser allows a user to zero the PEQ-15 during the day without personnel needing any night vision/IR vision devices.

For the US Marine Corps the PEQ-15 replaced the PEQ-2 on the M16 series service rifles, until the adoption of the H&K M27 IAR saw Corps change to the updated MIPIM AN/PEQ-16. The US Army regular forces are still issued the AN/PEQ-15 and the Ultra High Power LA-5C/PEQ variant remains listed on the SOPMOD phase II kit for SOF (Special Operations Forces). The Australian Army has since moved to the AN/PEQ-16 and is currently fielding the L3Harris Squad Rangefinder (SRF) to supplement squad (section) sized elements.

The PEQ-15 has a low profile body, and midline offset laser diodes that allow it to be top mounted to a rifle (on to the top of the hand guard or receiver), without obstructing the view of modern optics, or the lasers being obstructed by the front sight posts of the M4, M16 or other AR-15 pattern rifles, whereby the lasers and illuminator pass either side of front sight post. The PEQ-15 has a rear-facing control dial, and battery compartment allowing users to control the functions of the PEQ from behind the rifle, and to replace the batteries of the unit without requiring the unit to be removed, potentially disturbing the zero of the lasers. Windage and Elevation are adjusted with low profile screws on the top and sides of the unit. Each adjustment produces a positive click. The adjustment requires tooling to adjust windage/elevation and the low-profile design keeps the adjustment points from catching in the field. The PEQ-15A DBAL-A2 variant has forward facing battery compartment, with the rear of the unit being taken up with two function dials that face the user, with dials for power, and laser selection on each. The main functions of the PEQ-15 are:

- Visible Laser: The visible laser is a red laser that can be emitted from the unit with the press of the button. The visible red-dot can provide precise aiming of a weapon during daylight or night operations. There are higher power variants (HP LA-5A & UHP LA-5C) that provide a higher output Visible Laser for better view in the day. The Visible laser can only be used on its own, setting don't allow for it to be used with the IR laser or illuminator. The visible laser can be used to boresight the device to a weapon without the need of night vision goggles, as the lasers and illuminator are co-aligned, this zeroes all diode functions.
- IR Laser: emits a tightly focused beam of IR light for precise aiming of the weapon while wearing night vision goggles, or viewing the environment with an Infrared camera or weapon sights.
- IR Illuminator: provides additional IR illumination of a target or target area, it is operated through an adjustable lens with a turning bezel to vary the size of the illumination beam depending on target size and distance to the target, allowing adjustment from a flood light (105 mrad / °) mode to a single point spot-divergence (0.5 mrad / 0.029°) mode.

All variants of the PEQ-15 including the DBAL-A2 come included with a selection of Pattern Generator Filters (PGFs; also called Optical Instrument Reticles (OIR) by the DBAL-A2) that can be fitted to the units IR Illuminator and laser; in the case of the DBAL-A2 the illuminator and laser are separate from each other, and so different filters can be attached to either emitter; the PGF's can filter the laser or emitter into different shapes, including square, triangle, circle, cross, or T-shaped laser pointer; this may be useful for command and control purposes or to differentiate operators aiming point in the field, or during training.

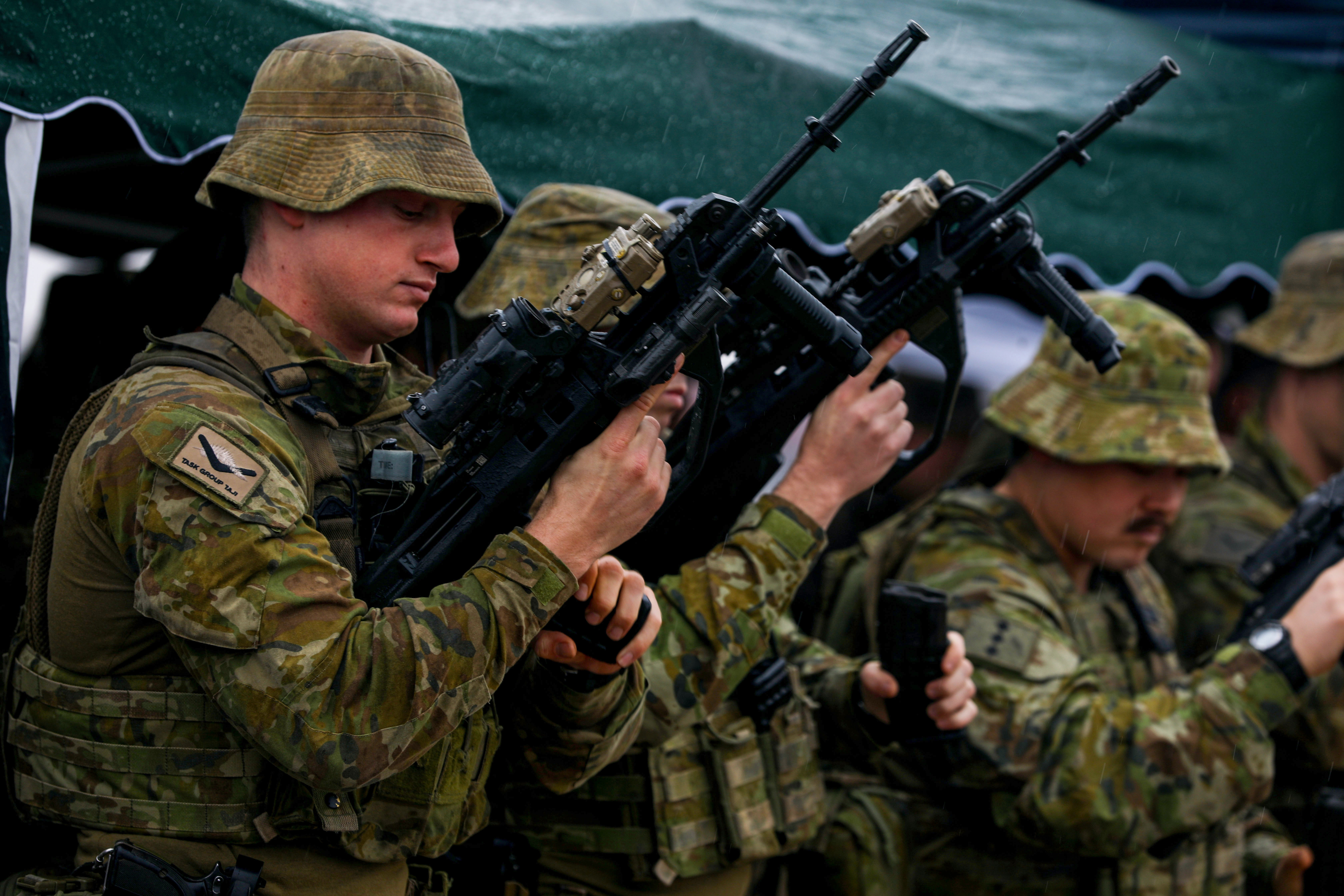
Australian soldiers with AN/PEQ-15s mounted to the top rail of the EF88 rifle.

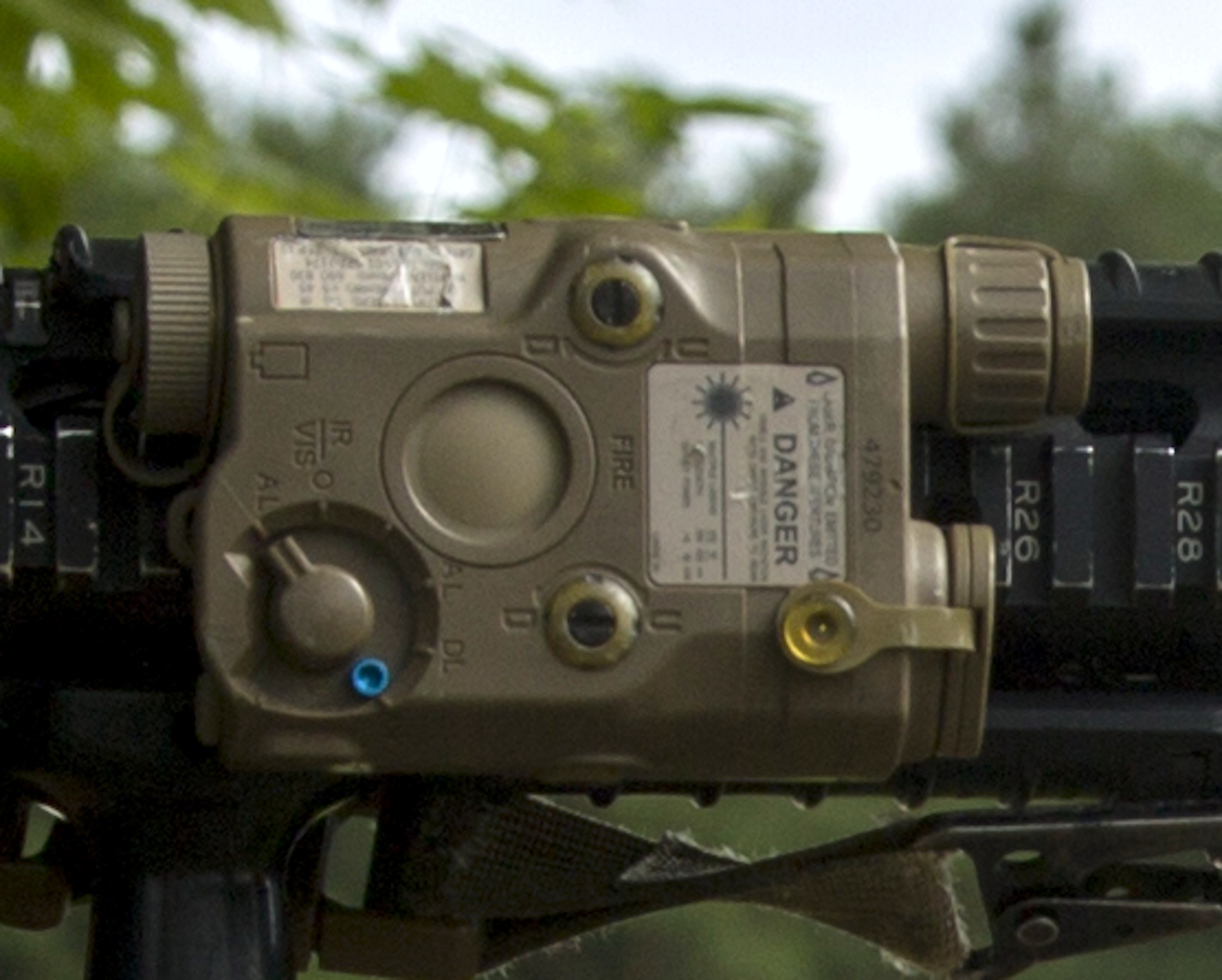
A L3Harris AN/PEQ-15 mounted to the side of a weapon handguard

== Variants ==
=== L3Harris / Insight Tech. ===
==== ATPIAL AN/PEQ-15 ====
The standard power PEQ-15 variant, with single power visible laser, and high and low, IR Laser and IR Illuminator module.

The low power modes can be used during force-on-force training, however the high-power modes should only be used on live fire ranges at ranges exceeding 220 meters. The single visible laser power output of the standard power PEQ-15 of only 5 mW means the visible laser is only visible during the day of with a range of > 25 m (82 ft) when NOT in direct sunlight.

==== LA-5B/PEQ | HP ATPIAL ====
The LA-5B/PEQ (formally, High Power ATPIAL (LA-5B/PEQ)) is the high-power variant of the PEQ-15, with a higher output visible laser, and IR Illuminator. The major benefit to the increase in the visible laser power is improved performance in direct sunlight, with six times more output power. The higher power IR illuminator allows users to use the illuminator as pointer being able to reach out to much farther distances.

==== LA-5C/PEQ | UHP ATPIAL ====
The LA-5C/PEQ; formally, Ultra High Power ATPIAL (LA-5C/PEQ), is the ultra-high-power variant of the PEQ-15, which carries forward the same high output IR Illuminator and Visible Laser from the HP LA-5B/PEQ, but with the addition of a significantly higher output IR laser. The Ultra High Power variant is in use by the United States Special Operations Command (SOCOM) as part of the SOPMOD Block II accessory kit for SOCOM rifles, replacing the Block I AN/PEQ-2.

===== Operation =====
The AN/PEQ-15 is operated using a main mode selector dial located on the top of the unit, with 8 options to select (9 on the UHP and HP variants), each mode corresponds to a single, or a dual combination of functions, these modes are detailed in the table below. Once the mode has been selected, the activation of the pressure pad activates the function selected. The unit has an inbuilt switch, but it also has a remote cable switch socket to allow for a remote pressure pad to be located elsewhere on the rifle, in a natural position that can be activated while shooting; this may be on a forward grip, or the handguard in a position accessible while aiming the rifle.

The high-power settings of the lasers and illuminator are classified as Class IIIB lasers and have the potential to damage eyesight; as the PEQ-15s are used in training environments when doing blank-fire, force on force training, only the low power settings are to be used, with the safety screw protecting inadvertent activation of the laser at high. The use of high-power settings is only permitted during operations, or in live fire exercises at distances exceeding 220 m (720 ft). All variants of the PEQ-15 are fitted with a blue-anodized safety screw within the mode selector dial, that physically locks out the high-power settings from being selected. The screw can be removed using a 3/32" hex key; however as these items are controlled, the removal of the screw in military units must be done by the unit armorer or equivalent only at the direct of the unit commander. The screw can be seen fitted in the images of the top of the PEQ-15.

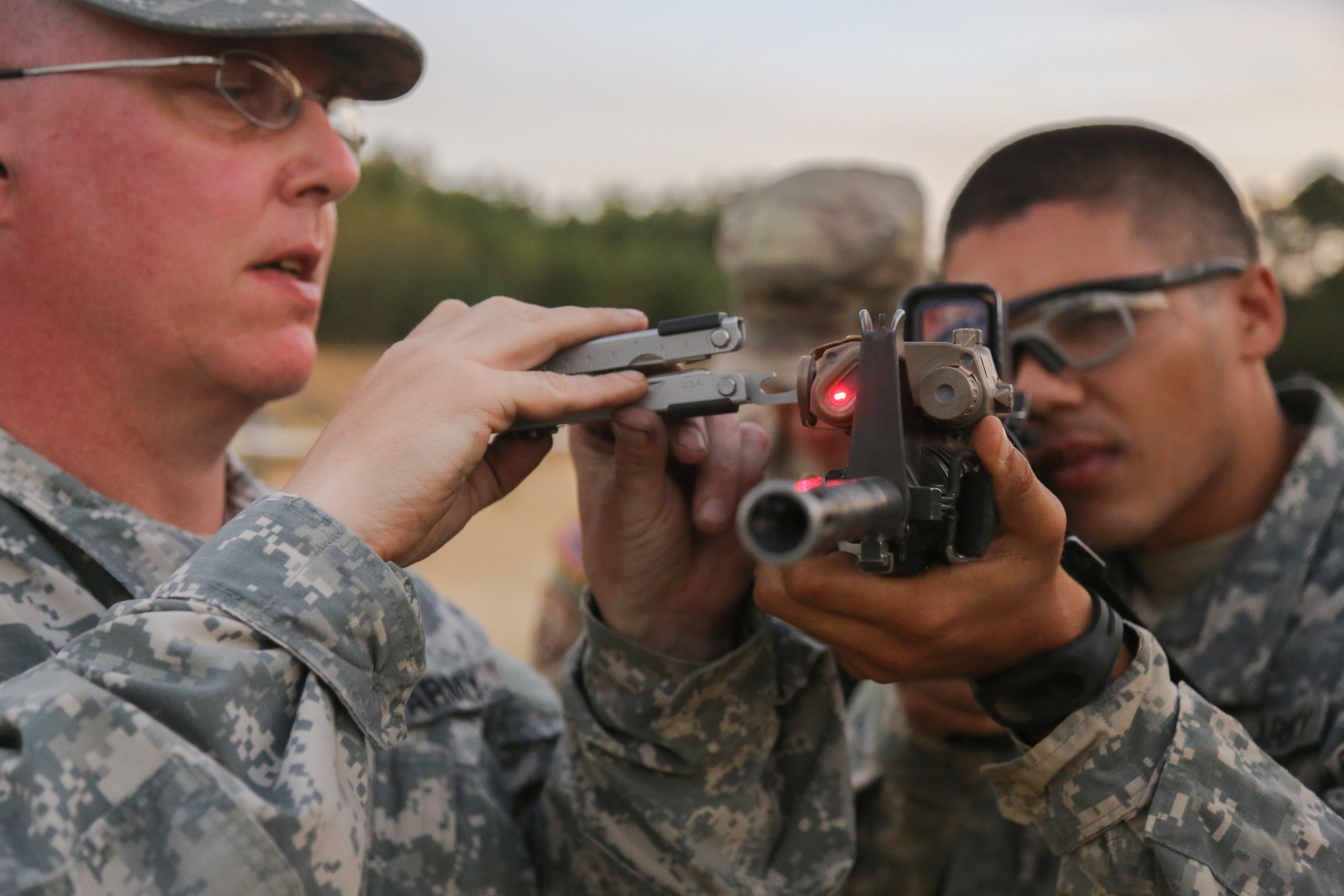
US Army Soldier adjusts the point of aim of the visible laser of the AN/PEQ-15 attached to an M4 Rifle

AN/PEQ-15 SETTINGS
DIAL POSITION	MODE	DESCRIPTION
VIS AL	Vis Aiming Laser	Visible Aim Laser ON (Note: On The LA-5A/B HP and LA-5C UHP this is the Visible Laser Low, and there is an extra setting position for Vis Laser High.)
O	OFF	Prevents inadvertent laser burst
P	Program	Sets the desired IR pulse rate
AL	AIM LOW	IR Aiming Laser set to LOW
DL	DUAL LOW	IR Aiming Laser and Illuminator set to LOW
AH	AIM HIGH	IR Aiming Laser set to HIGH
IH	ILLUM HIGH	IR Illuminator set to HIGH
DH	DUAL HIGH	IR Aiming Laser and IR Illuminator set to HIGH

=== Steiner-Defense ===
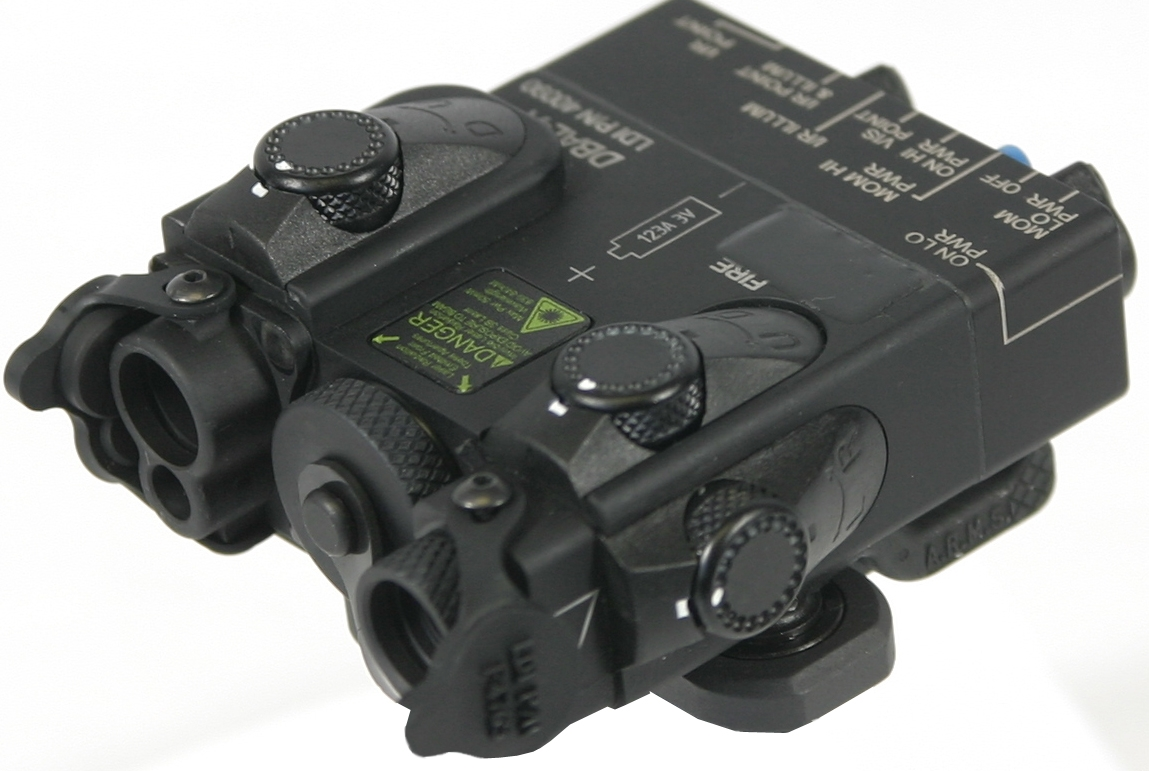
The Steiner AN/PEQ-15A DBAL-A2 looks considerably different to the L3 AN/PEQ-15

==== AN/PEQ-15A – DBAL-A2 ====
The AN/PEQ-15A – DBAL-A2 (Note: Sometimes stylised also as DBAL-A²) (Dual Beam Aiming Laser – Advanced-2) is an alternative of the L3Harris variants that is manufactured by Steiner Optics, and has the designation AN-PEQ-15A. The DBAL-A2 was originally manufactured by Laser Devices Inc. (LDI), however LDI was acquired by Steiner in 2012.

Like the L3Harris variants, the visible and IR aiming lasers on the DBAL-A2 are co-aligned with a single setting adjustment to windage and elevation to move and zero both beams, a soldier can use either the IR or Visible laser to boresight/zero the device to the rifle. The Steiner DBAL-A2 variant was offered with two different visible laser wavelengths, with the standard being 635 nm (±3%) Red, and the alternative being the 532 nm Green visible laser.

===== Operation =====
The DBAL-A2 differs from the L3 variants by having two function select dials on the rear of the unit. The left-hand dial selects the power and operation mode, and the right dial selects the specific laser, illuminator or combination to use. Similar to the L3 units, the DBAL-A2 also has a safety screw to lockout high-power modes, on the left dial, locking out the MOM HI PWR and ON HI PWR (Note: 'MOM HI PWR' (Momentary High Power) and 'MOM LO PWR' (Momentary Low Power) setting will change the switch operation to "momentary", and operate the selected laser/illuminator (right dial) only while the operator holds the switch, and will turn off when released. The 'ON HI PWR' and 'ON LOW PWR' setting will change the switch operation to "ON/OFF" switch, requiring one press to turn on and one press to turn off.) selector options.

DBAL-A2 SETTINGS
LEFT DIAL (SW & PWR)	DESCRIPTION	RIGHT DIAL (EMITTER)	DESCRIPTION
ON LO PWR	Constant ON/OFF Switch - LOW Power	VIS POINT	Visible Laser
MOM LO PWR	Momentary Switch - LOW Power	I/R ILLUM	Infrared Illuminator
OFF	Device OFF	I/R POINT & ILLUM	Simultaneous Infrared Laser Pointer and Illuminator
MOM HI PWR	Momentary Switch - HIGH Power	I/R POINT	Infrared Laser Pointer
ON HI PWR	Constant ON/OFF Switch - HIGH Power		

== Comparative specifications ==
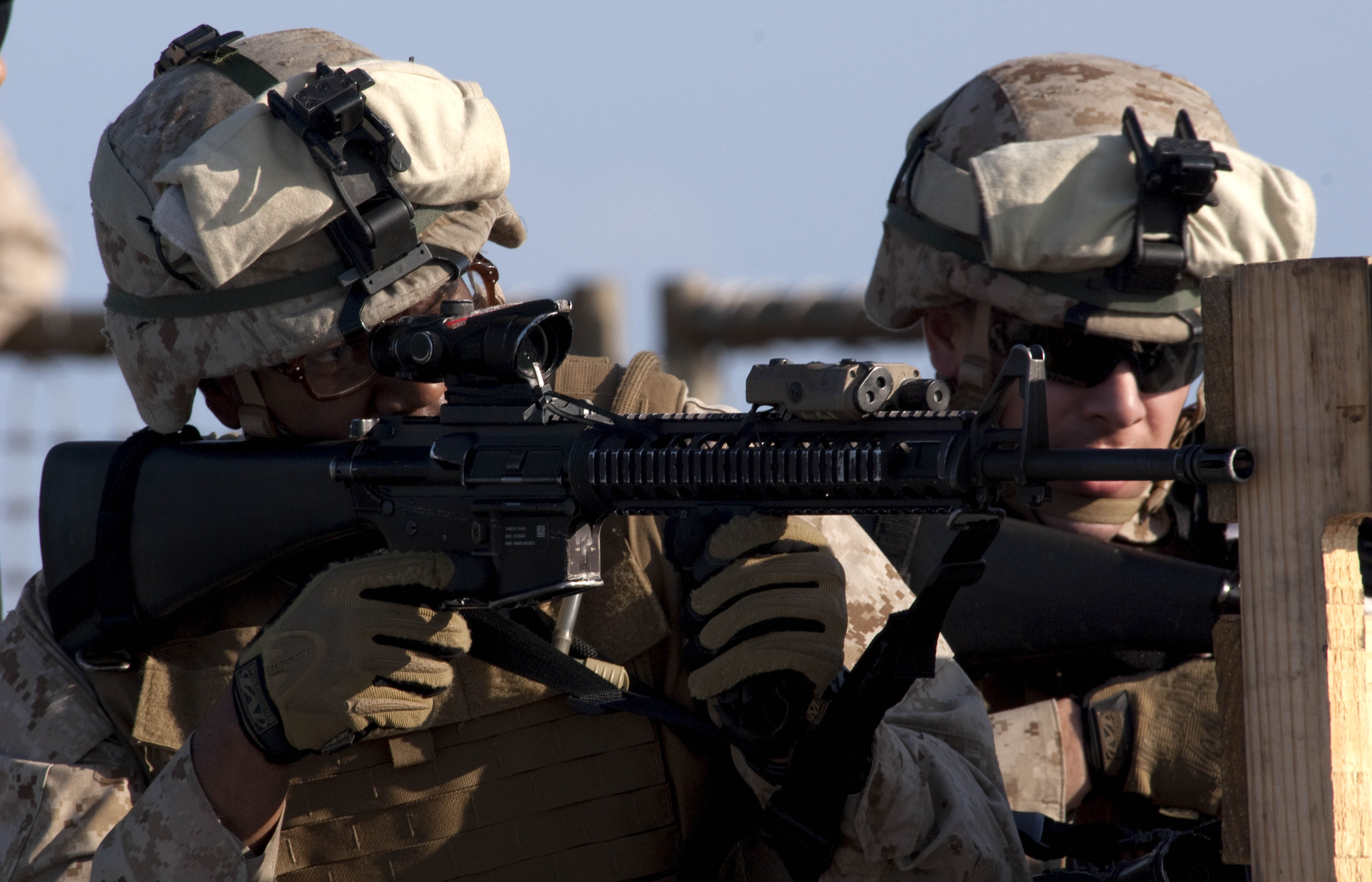
US Marine aims an M16A4 fitted with AN/PEQ-15 to the top of the handguard.

	L3Harris / Insight Technologies			
	AN/PEQ-15 (Note: [AN/PEQ-15 Specifications Datasheet])	HP LA-5B/PEQ	UHP LA-5C/PEQ	AN/PEQ-15A DBAL-A2
Manufacturer	L3Harris			Steiner Optics
Dimensions	117 × 71 × 41 mm / 4.6" × 2.8" × 1.6" (L×W×H)			89 × 70 × 40.5 mm / 3.5" × 2.75" × 1.59" (L×W×H)
Weight	213 g (7.5 oz) w/ battery			227 g (8 oz) w/ Battery
Power	1× 3V DL123A battery			1 x DL 123A Battery
Battery Life	>6 hours (in Dual High DH setting)			>3 hours (mode dependent)
Waterproof	6 m (20 ft) for 1 hour			Submersible to 5 m (16 ft)
Visible Laser				Visible Laser
Class	IIIB	IIIR (Low), IIIB (High)		IIIB
Output	5.0 mW	Low: 3.5 mW; High: 30 mW		<5 mW
Divergence	0.5 mrad			<0.8 mrad
Wavelength	Red (635 ± 15 nm)	Red (645 ± 20 nm)	Red (645 ± 20 nm)	Red (635 nm ± 3%) or Green (532 nm)
Range	Day: >25 m (82 ft) (Note: Not in direct sunlight)	Day: >150 m (492 ft); Night: 2,000 m (6,562 ft)	Day: >175 m (574 ft); Night: 3,000 m (9,843 ft)	>25 m (82 ft) in day
IR Laser				IR Laser
Class	IIIR (Low), IIIB (High)			IIIR (Low), IIIB (High)
Output	Low: 0.7 mW; High: 27.5 mW		Low: 0.7 mW; High: 50 mW	<50 mW
Divergence	————— 0.5 mrad —————			<0.8 mrad
Wavelength	————— (835 ± 15 nm) —————			840 nm ± 3%
Range	Low: >600 m (1,969 ft); High: 2,000 m (6,562 ft)		Low: >600 m (1,969 ft); High: 5,000 m (16,404 ft)	High: 2,500 metres (8,202 ft)
IR Illuminator				IR Illuminator
Class	IIIB	IIIB	IIIB	IIIB
Output	Low: 3.5 mW; High: 45 mW	Low: 3.5 mW; High: 100 mW		<50 mW
Divergence	————— 1—105 mRad (Adjustable lens) —————			1—100 mrad
Wavelength	————— (835 ± 15 nm) —————			840 nm ± 3%
Range	Low: >600 m (1,969 ft); High: 2,000 m (6,562 ft)	Low: >600 m (1,969 ft); High: 4,000 m (13,123 ft)	Low: >600 m (1,969 ft); High: 10,000 m (32,808 ft)	High: 2,500 metres (8,202 ft)
NSN	Black: 5855-01-534-5931 Tan: 5855-01-577-7174	Black, Tan: 5855-01-533-0555		Black: 5855-01-535-6166 Green: 5855-01-579-0062

== Operators ==
=== Current operators ===
- Australia: AN/PEQ-15 used by Australian infantry and Special Forces on both the EF-88 and SOCOMD M4A5 Carbine, the PEQ-15 is being phased out for the AN/PEQ-16B which will be supplemented at the squad level with the L3Harris Squad Rangefinder (SRF).
- New Zealand: Used on the New Zealand service rifle – LMT Modular Assault Rifle System – Light (MARS-L).
- Russia: Russian security forces have been photographed with variants of the PEQ-15.
- Iraq: Used by Iraqi Special Operations Forces on Sig Sauer M400 self-loading rifles.
- Taliban: After the withdrawal of U.S. forces from Afghanistan in 2021, the Taliban captured a large amount of U.S. military equipment given to Afghanistan as aid, including the AN/PEQ-15.
- United States: In use by the US military. The UHP LA-5C/PEQ is in use by USSOCOM forces within the SOPMOD Block II kit.
  - Los Angeles Police Department: LAPD SWAT adopted the green laser DBAL-A2 variant of the PEQ-15.

== Gallery ==
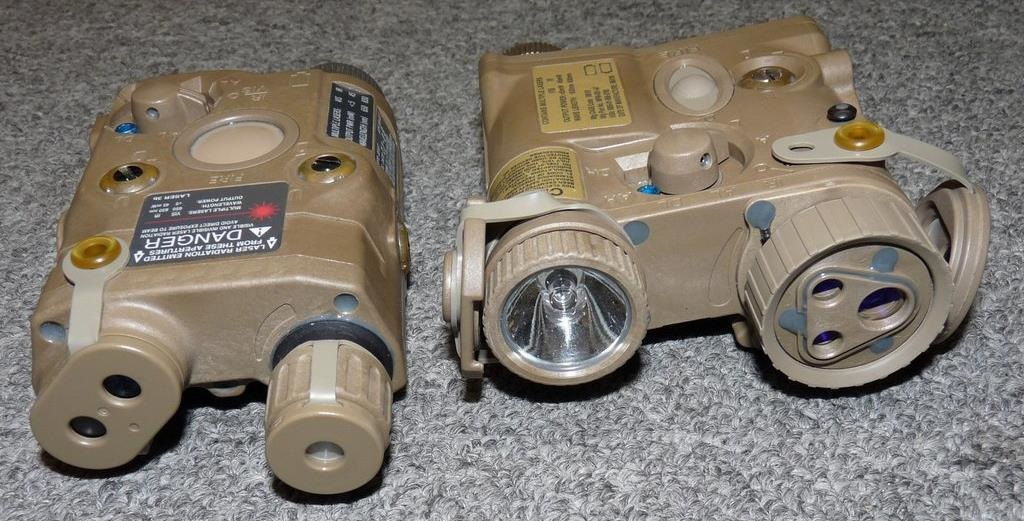
An AN/PEQ-15 and the newer AN/PEQ-16, also made by L3Harris.

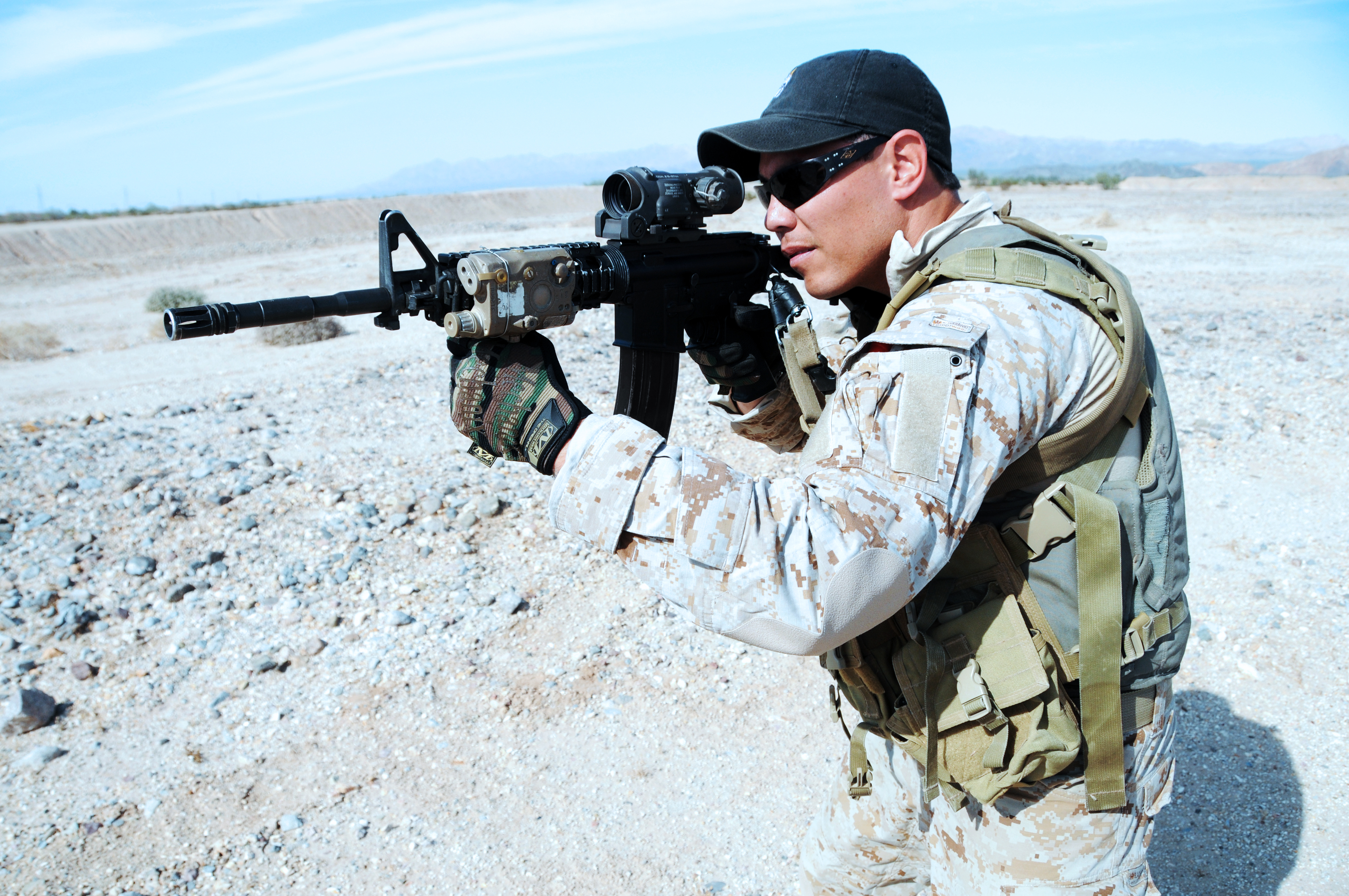
A US Navy SEAL aims his M4 carbine with an attached LA-5C/PEQ as part of the SOPMOD Kit.

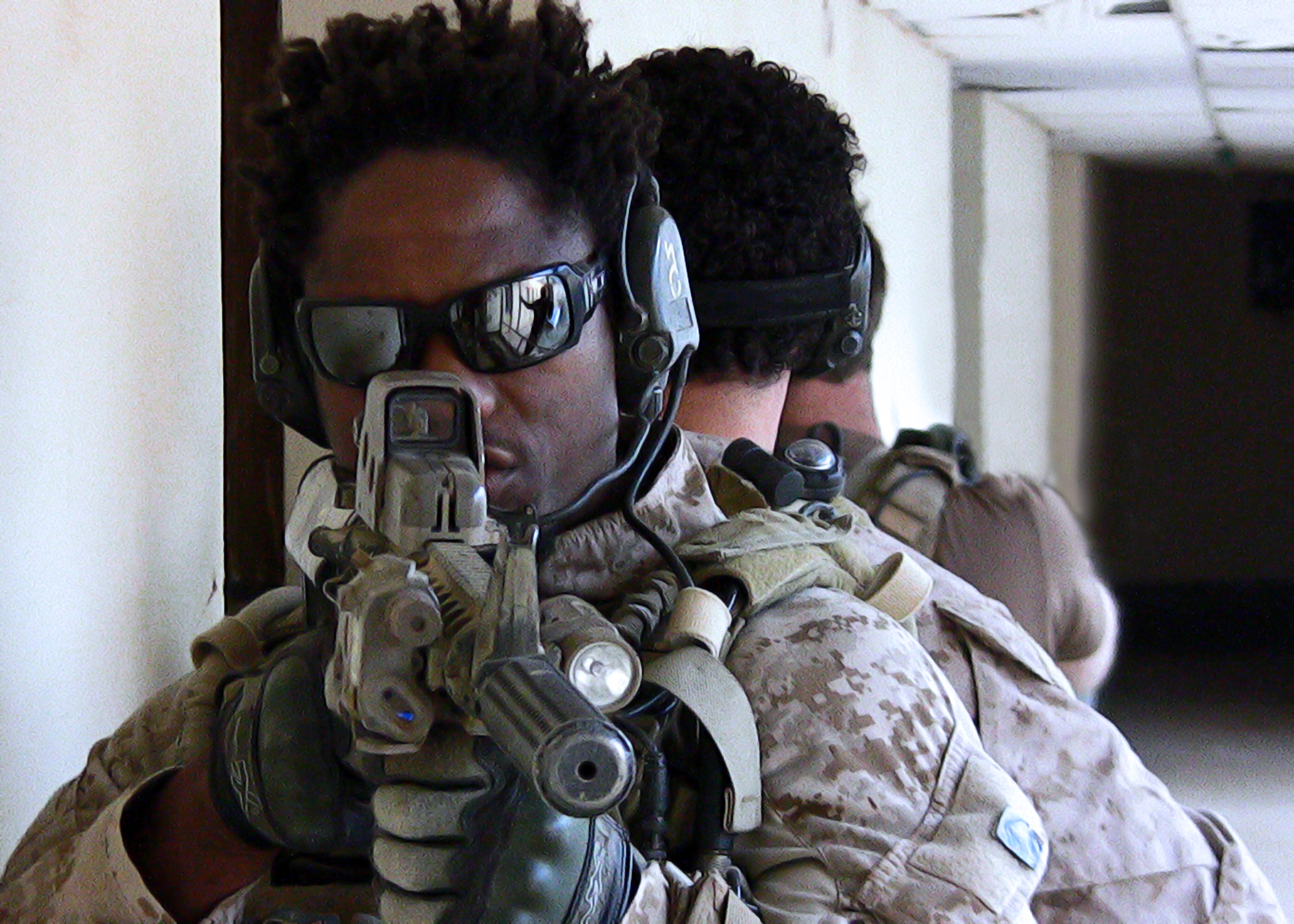
A US Navy SEAL aiming his CQBR, with attached UHP PE-5C/PEQ.

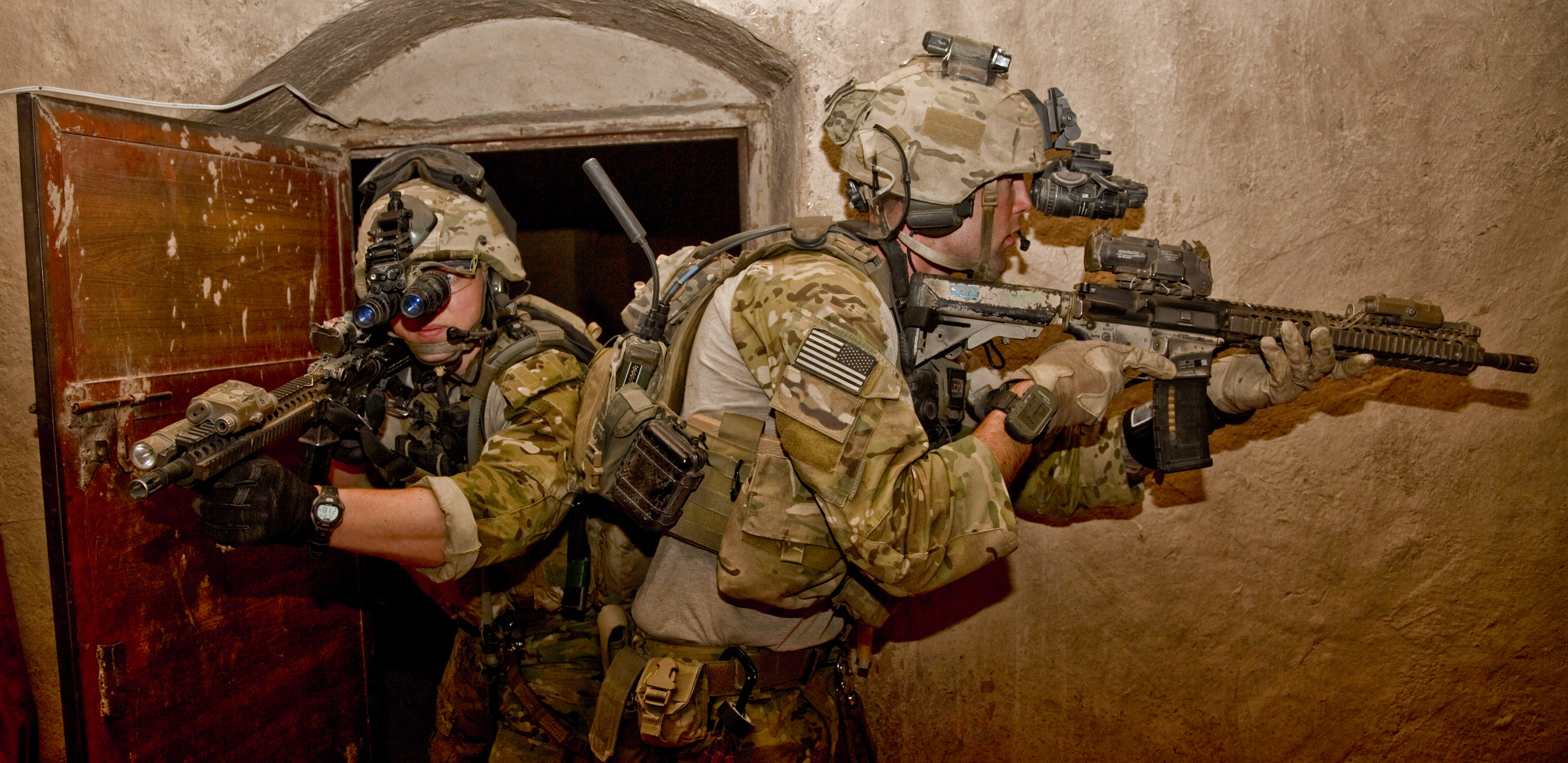
Two 75th Ranger Regiment operators armed with SOPMOD Block II variant M4A1 carbines with LA-5C/PEQs.

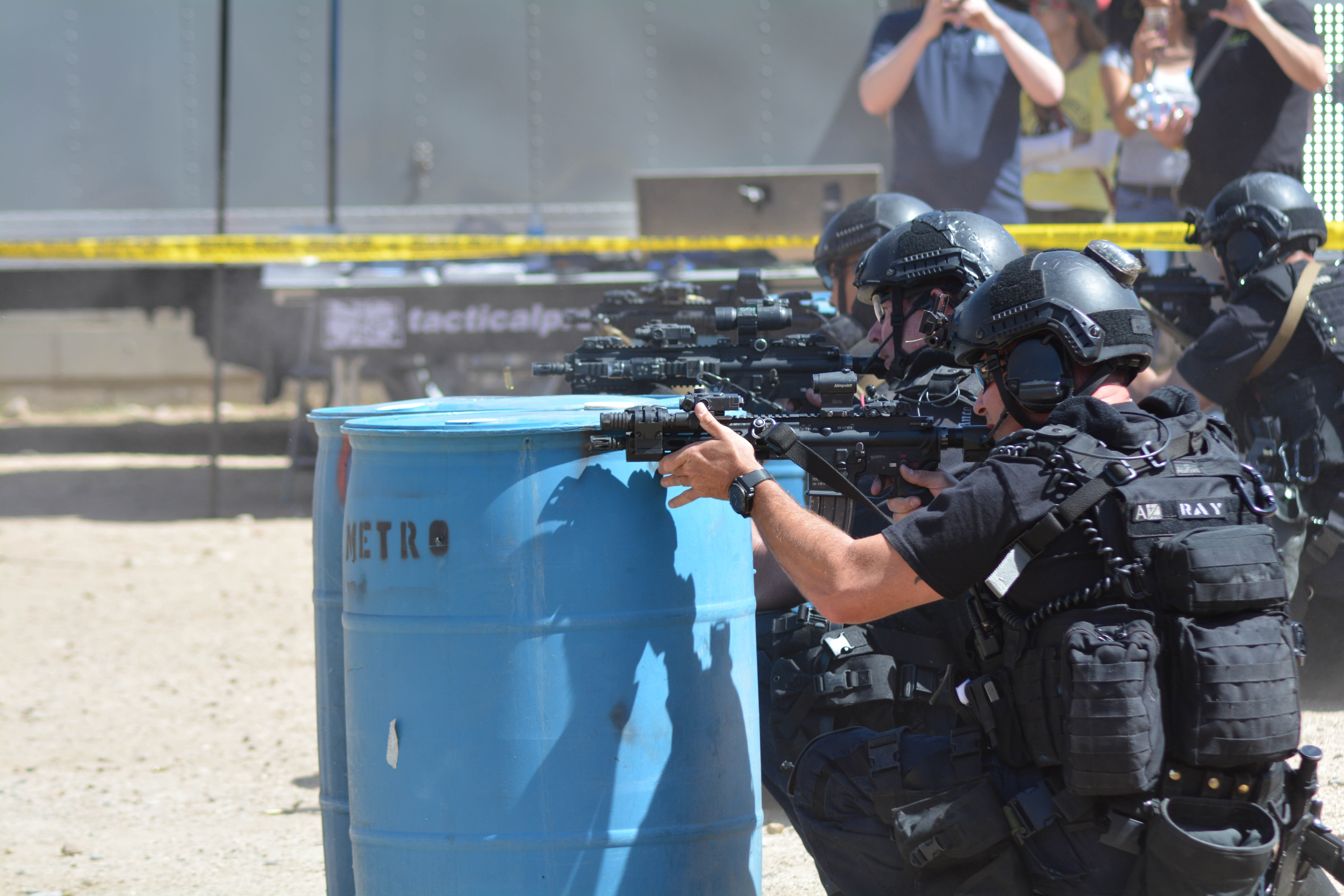
LAPD SWAT Officers firing HK416 assault rifles fitted with the DBAL-A2 variant PEQ-15, on the top of the handguard.

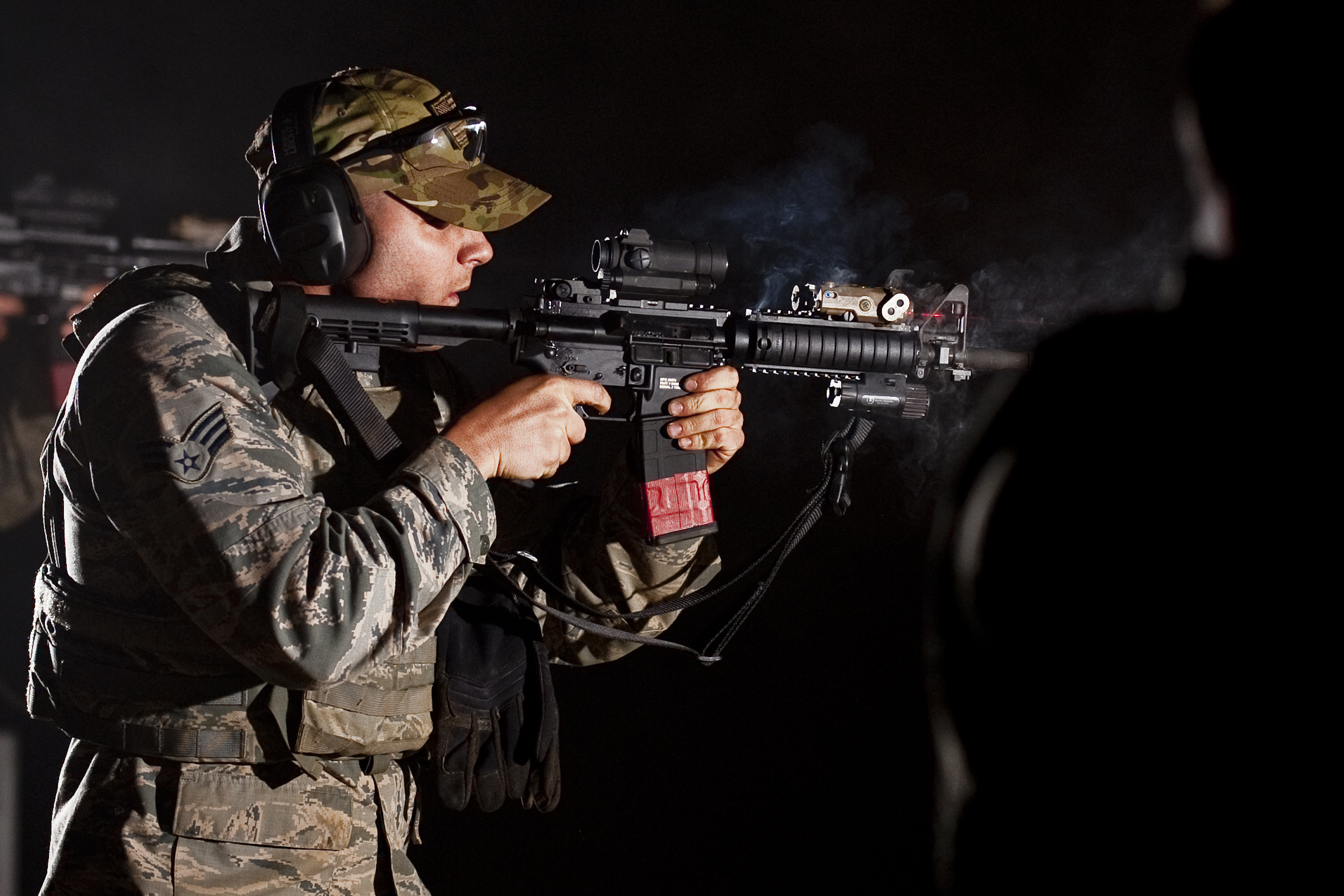
A USAF airman aiming his M4 with an AN/PEQ-15 an night.

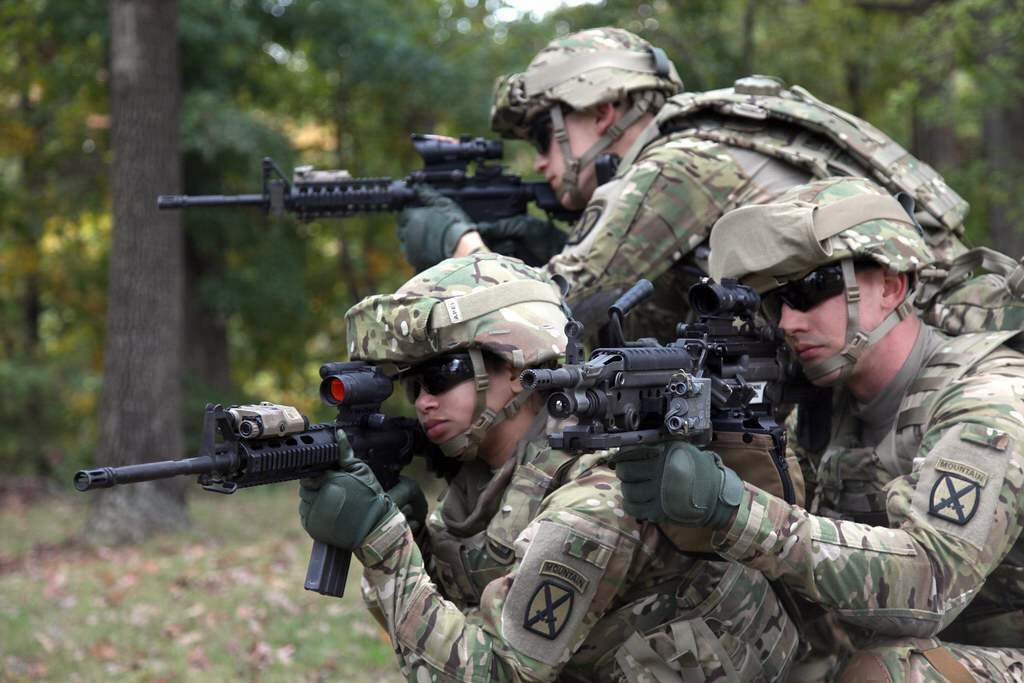
US Army 10th Mountain Division soldiers; (bottom‑left) AN/PEQ-15 attached to an M4 carbine; (bottom‑right) DBAL-A2 attached to M249 SAW.

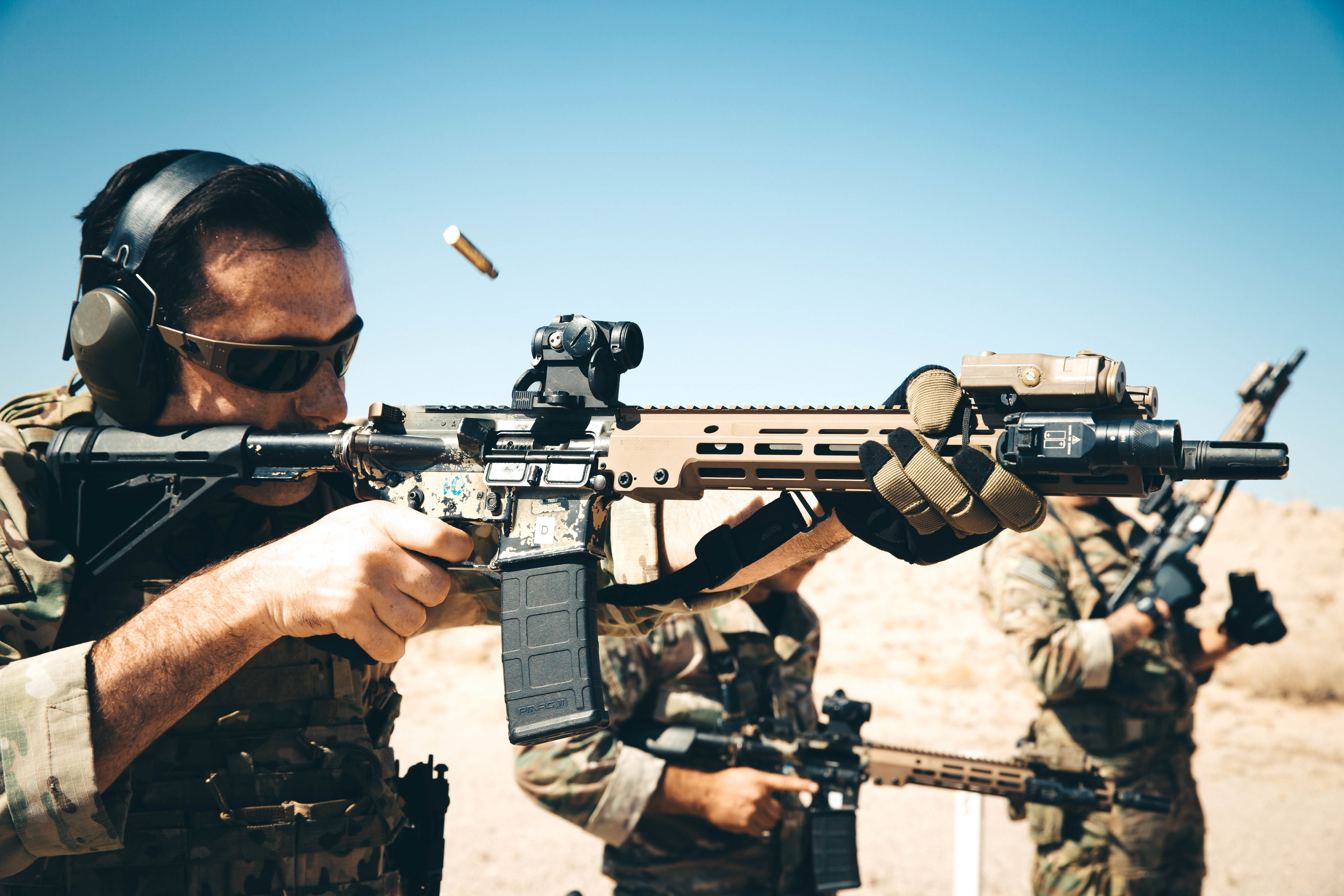
URG-I variant M4A1 carbine has M-LOK rail handguard with an LA-5C/PEQ top rail used by one of the Green Berets from 3rd SFG (A) during training at Marine Corps Air Ground Combat Center, Twentynine Palms, California in 2019.

== See also ==
- AN/PEQ-1 SOFLAM – Laser Target Designator, Special Operations Forces Laser Acquisition Marker
- AN/PEQ-2 – US Military Laser Aiming Module
- AN/PEQ-6 – Laser Aiming Module for the H&K Mk. 23 – USSOCOM Offensive Handgun Weapon System (OHWS)
- AN/PEQ-5 – Visible Laser Module for the M4 carbine
- AN/PEQ-16 – Successor to the ATPIAL PEQ-15
- SOPMOD – Special Operations Peculiar MODification accessory system
- List of military electronics of the United States
