= AN/PEQ-2 =

US military laser sight

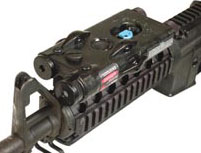
- AN/PEQ-2A Aiming Light mounted on an M4 carbine
- Place of origin: United States

Service history
- Used by: United States Armed Forces
- Wars: War in Afghanistan; Iraq War

Production history
- Manufacturer: Insight Technology
- Variants: AN/PEQ-2, AN/PEQ-2A, AN/PEQ-2B, AN/PEQ-2C

General Specifications
- Weight: 210 g (excluding batteries and mount)

IR Laser Specifications
- IR Laser Class: I, IIIb
- IR Laser Output (mw): 25 mW
- IR Laser Divergence (mrad): 0.3 mrad
- IR Laser Wavelength (nm): 830 nm
- IR Laser Range (m): >10 miles

IR Illuminator Specifications
- IR Illuminator Class: IIIb
- IR Illuminator Output (mw): 30 mW
- IR Illuminator Divergence (mrad): 3 mrad to 10°
- IR Illuminator Wavelength (nm): 830 nm

The AN/PEQ-2 Infrared Target Pointer/Illuminator/Aiming Light (ITPIAL) is a laser sight for use on rifles fitted with a Picatinny rail. It was manufactured by Insight Technology.

In accordance with the Joint Electronics Type Designation System (JETDS), the "AN/PEQ-2" designation represents the second design of an Army-Navy electronic device for portable laser combination equipment. The JETDS system also now is used to name all Department of Defense electronic systems.

== History ==
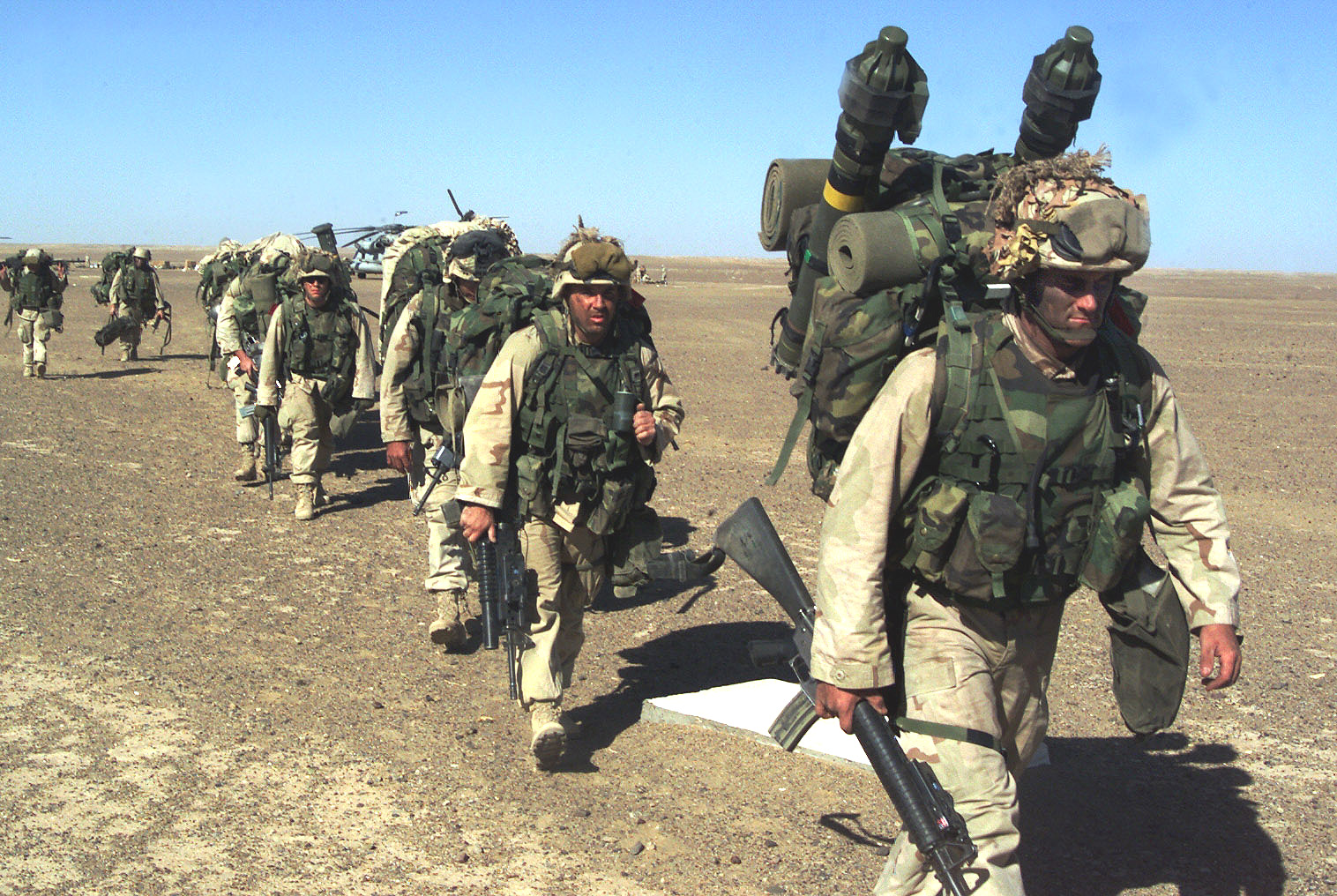
U.S. Marines in November 2001 armed with M16A2 rifles equipped with AN/PEQ-2s.

The AN/PEQ-2 succeeded the AN/PAQ-4C, which was designed in the early 1990s after the Persian Gulf War. It was widely used by US forces during the War in Afghanistan and the Iraq War.

The device is still seeing active service but is being withdrawn and replaced amongst U.S. Armed Forces. It was also part of the U.S. SOPMOD kit, though the device is being replaced by the new smaller LA-5/PEQ-15.

== Operation ==
The AN/PEQ-2 has two infrared laser emitters;one narrow beam used for aiming the rifle and one wide beam used for illuminating targets, like a flashlight. The beams can only be seen through night vision goggles. Each beam can be zeroed independently, and the illuminator's radius is adjustable. The two lasers are tied into one 6-mode switch, which has the following modes:

Mode	Mode's Marking	Targeting laser	IR illuminator
0	OFF	off	off
1	AIM LO	low power	off
2	AIM HI	high power	off
3	ILLUM	off	on
4	DUAL LO	low power	low power
5	DUAL HI	high power	high power

Turning the mode switch does not turn on the lasers. A recessed button on top of the device is tapped once to briefly turn on the lasers or tapped twice to turn the lasers on until deactivated, either by pressing a third time or by turning the mode switch to off. Additionally, an extra pressure switch can be plugged into the rear of the device and then placed virtually anywhere, limited only by the length of the pressure switch's cord; typically one to two feet. This pressure switch operates the same way as the recessed button.

== AN/PEQ-2A ==
The AN/PEQ-2A upgrade incorporates a blue removable safety block which physically prevents turning the mode switch to any of the high-power modes, which are capable of causing eye damage. Both variants are waterproof to a depth of 20 meters and run on two AA batteries.

Mode	Mode's Marking	Targeting laser	IR illuminator
0	OFF	off	off
1	AIM LO	low power	off
2	DUAL LO	low power	low power
3	AIM HI	high power	off
4	DUAL LO/HI	low power	high power
5	DUAL HI	high power	high power

== Users ==
- Afghanistan
- United States

== See also ==
- Laser sight (firearms)
- AN/PEQ-6
- AN/PEQ-15
- AN/PEQ-16
- List of military electronics of the United States
