= AN/PEQ-6 =

Laser aiming module

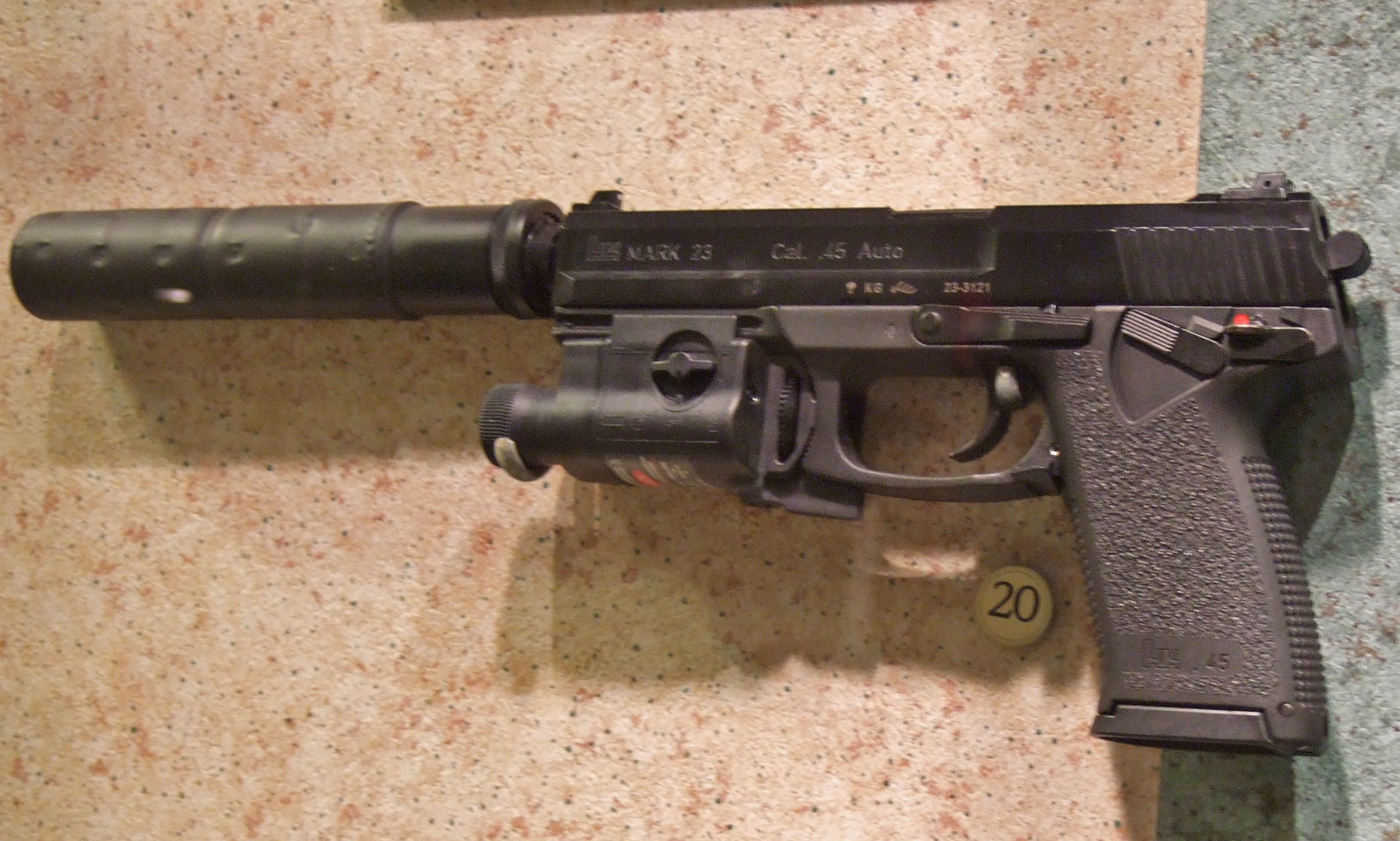
HK MK23 with KAC suppressor and AN/PEQ-6 LAM mounted

The AN/PEQ-6 Integrated Laser Light Module (ILLM) is a laser aiming module (LAM) designed and manufactured by Insight Technology for use by United States Special Operations Command (USSOCOM) with the Heckler & Koch Mark 23 semi-automatic pistol and a Knight's Armament Company suppressor; the whole system is designated the Mk 23 Mod 0 Offensive Handgun Weapon System.

In accordance with the Joint Electronics Type Designation System (JETDS), the "AN/PEQ-6" designation represents the 6th design of an Army-Navy electronic device for portable laser combination equipment. The JETDS system also now is used to name all Department of Defense electronic systems.

The device attaches to the accessory rail on the frame, under the barrel, and creates a small laser dot very near the point of bullet impact (within certain ranges). It was developed in the 1990s under the Offensive Handgun Weapon System (OHWS) program run by USSOCOM.

It consists of a laser projector on the left side of the LAM and two tactical flashlights on the right side. One setting of the laser produces a visible light dot, while the other setting produces infrared (IR) light. The illuminator section has a rectangular white light flashlight on the upper part and a rectangular infrared flashlight on the lower part. The IR elements can only be seen whilst wearing night vision goggles.

A boxier early version of the LAM was created by Insight before the smaller more rounded design was finally selected as the AN/PEQ-6. This boxier design can be seen in some games like Metal Gear Solid.

== See also ==
- AN/PEQ-2
- AN/PEQ-5
- List of military electronics of the United States
