= NOBLEX E-Optics GmbH =

NOBLEX E-Optics GmbH, formerly Docter Optics, is a German manufacturer of optics, including binoculars, rifle scopes, spotting scopes, red dot sights, flashlights and reading glasses. Its headquarters are in Eisfeld, Thuringia, Germany, where most of the products are developed and manufactured. Docter is part of the Analytik Jena Group.

== History ==
The company grew out of binocular production by the forerunner of Carl Zeiss AG before World War Two. In 1952 a part of the company VEB Carl Zeiss Jena was established in Eisfeld in what was then East Germany. Starting from tasks as supplier of parts and pre-assembling products for the Zeiss factories in Jena the company continuously developed over the following years to become a producer of precision-engineered optical consumer goods and industrial products. Besides that VEB Carl Zeiss Jena produced military optics for the armed forces of the German Democratic Republic (GDR) like the NVA DF 7x40 and NVA EDF 7x40 roof prism binoculars.

A year after the German reunification, the Eisfeld plant of the Jenoptik Carl Zeiss Jena GmbH, which employed 550 staff, was taken over by Bernhard Docter, who lent his name to the company and products. The company now traded under the name Docter-Optic-Eisfeld GmbH and continued with the production of binoculars, riflescopes, spotting scopes, magnifying glasses and opto-electronic measurement equipment. The company Docter-Optic in Wetzlar declared bankruptcy for the whole business on 15 November 1995.

On 1 May 1997 a part of the business with 40 staff was continued by Analytik Jena GmbH, to which traditionally good relations existed. Already the first year after the takeover was completed with very good turnover and results. By 2006 Docter Optics employed 100 staff.

On 1 May 2016 Docter Optics was acquired by Noblex GmbH, a subsidiary of the Frankfurt holding company VF Capital GmbH. At IWA Show in 2018 the process of re-branding started and most of the products received Noblex brand name. Most of the older model lines were discontinued in 2018 and new products lines were renamed in accordance with the Noblex brand nomenclature.

== Products ==
Since the beginning of 2019 Noblex Optics is producing Binoculars, Telescopic sights, Red dot sights and Monoculars.

Majority of their production is concentrated on their Red Dot Sights, which are well known globally. Noblex Sights are produced in the following variants:

- Noblex Sight II Plus
- Noblex Sight II Plus IPSC
- Noblex Sight C
- Noblex Sight III
- Noblex QuickSight

Noblex QuickSights is significantly different that all other Noblex Red Dot Sights, since it is designed to fit on shotguns and to mount directly on shotgun ribs. It comes with 5.0 MOA dot as standard. The rest Noblex Sights share the same footprint that became an industry standard and is used also by brands like Meopta, Vortex Optics, Leica Camera and others. They come with either 3.5 MOA red dot (for rifle use) or with 7.0 MOA red dot (for handgun use).

Riflescopes produced by Noblex are divided in the following series:

- Noblex N6 ED
- Noblex N6 (formerly known as Docter V6)
- Noblex N5
- Noblex N4 (Formerly known as Docter Basic)

The number in the naming stands for the zoom factor. All of the Noblex rifle scopes come with illuminated reticle as standard.

Noblex is also producing the following binoculars in 2019.

- Noblex ED (8x42, 10x42 and 8x56)
- Noblex Compact (8x21 and 10x25)
- Noblex B/GA (7x40 and 10x42)

They are all produced in Jena and ED models feature magnesium housing and Open Bridge design.

Noblex also produces a single monocular called Noblex Mono 8x21 which has an unusual design incorporating a Porro prism.
