= AN/PEQ-16 =

Military infrared laser aiming module

MIPIM AN/PEQ-16
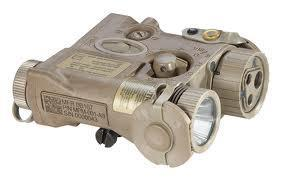
- The MIPIM (AN/PEQ-16) that can be mounted to a firearm.
- Function(s): Infrared target laser and illuminator

Service history
- In service: 2012–present
- Used by: United States; Australia; United Kingdom
- Wars: Global war on terrorism; Russo-Ukrainian War

Production history
- Designer: Insight Technology
- Manufacturer: L3Harris
- NSN: 5855-01-577-7174 (tan); 5855-01-534-5931 (black)
- Unit cost: ~$2,000 USD
- Variants: MIPIM AN/PEQ-16

General Specifications
- Dimensions (L×H×W): 100 mm (4.1 in) x 81 mm (3.2 in) x 43 mm (1.7 in)
- Weight: 281 g (9.9 oz)

IR Laser Specifications
- IR Laser Class: IIIR (Low), IIIB (High)
- IR Laser Output (mw): Low: 0.6 mW; High: 25 mW
- IR Laser Divergence (mrad): 0.5 mrad
- IR Laser Wavelength (nm): (840 ± 20 nm)
- IR Laser Range (m): Low: >600 m (1,969 ft); High: 2,000 m (6,562 ft)

Visible Laser Specifications
- Visible Laser Class: IIIB
- Visible Laser Output (mw): 4.0 mW
- Visible Laser Divergence (mrad): 0.5 mrad
- Visible Laser Wavelength (nm): (635 ± 30 nm)
- Visible Laser Range (m): >25 m (82 ft) in direct sun

IR Illuminator Specifications
- IR Illuminator Class: IIIB
- IR Illuminator Output (mw): Low: 3.5 mW; High: 30 mW
- IR Illuminator Divergence (mrad): 1–105 mrad (adjustable lens)
- IR Illuminator Wavelength (nm): (840 ± 20 nm)
- IR Illuminator Range (m): Low: >600 m (1,969 ft); High: 2,000 m (6,562 ft)

Visible Flashlight Specifications
- Visible Light Output (lumens): 125

The Mini Integrated Pointing Illumination Module (MIPIM) or AN/PEQ-16 manufactured by Insight/L3Harris is the successor to the AN/PEQ-15 which is the most widely used IR Laser Aiming Module (LAM) in the world.

In accordance with the Joint Electronics Type Designation System (JETDS), the "AN/PEQ-16" designation represents the 16th design of an Army-Navy electronic device for portable laser combination equipment. The JETDS system also now is used to name all Department of Defense electronic systems.

The AN/PEQ-16 was introduced to the market in 2009, where it began to replace the AN/PEQ-15 on US Marine Corps small arms. The PEQ-16 is a slightly different form-factor to the PEQ-15, being shorter, but larger overall. The most notable adopter of the AN/PEQ-16 as the standard infantry LAM was the United States Marine Corps (USMC) with the initial introduction of the M27 IAR to replace all M249 SAWs in USMC service, and then in 2017 the decision by the USMC Commandant for all Marine infantryman to field the M27.

== Design and development ==
Initial variants of the AN/PEQ-16 were designated 'alpha' with an A suffix, these initial devices were manufactured with an incandescent bulb for the white-light illuminator, while the newer B 'bravo' model uses a white-light LED.

Currently issued in the USMC, the AN/PEQ-16B helps to consolidate the number of attachments on the hand guards of infantry weapons, including the visible, and infrared lasers, an infrared illuminator, and a white-light illuminator for urban or dark environments where night vision devices may be impractical or not available. The PEQ-16 can be operated via a separate pressure pad or an integrated button pad. The PEQ-16 combines the functions of the previous PEQ-15 with a visible white-light illuminator.

The PEQ-16 shares a number of features with the PEQ-15 including: waterproof polymer construction, integrated thumbscrew mount, providing a strong and repeatable lockup on M1913 (Picatinny) rails; a similar top-mounted mode selection dial. The PEQ-16 has a number of different modes of operation, including: IR Laser, IR Illuminator, Visible Laser, Visible Light. The lasers and illuminator are co-aligned and assembled into a single rotary module allowing single adjustment zeroing, with the ability to change the size of the IR Illuminator beam. The Visible light is located on the opposite side to the laser module, but cannot be activated with the laser in order to prevent white light discharge, and pollution.

As part of the M27 IAR rollout in 2011, a number of standard accessories were chosen to be included with every M27, including an AN/PEQ-16 to allow for improved night and day operations.

== Operation ==
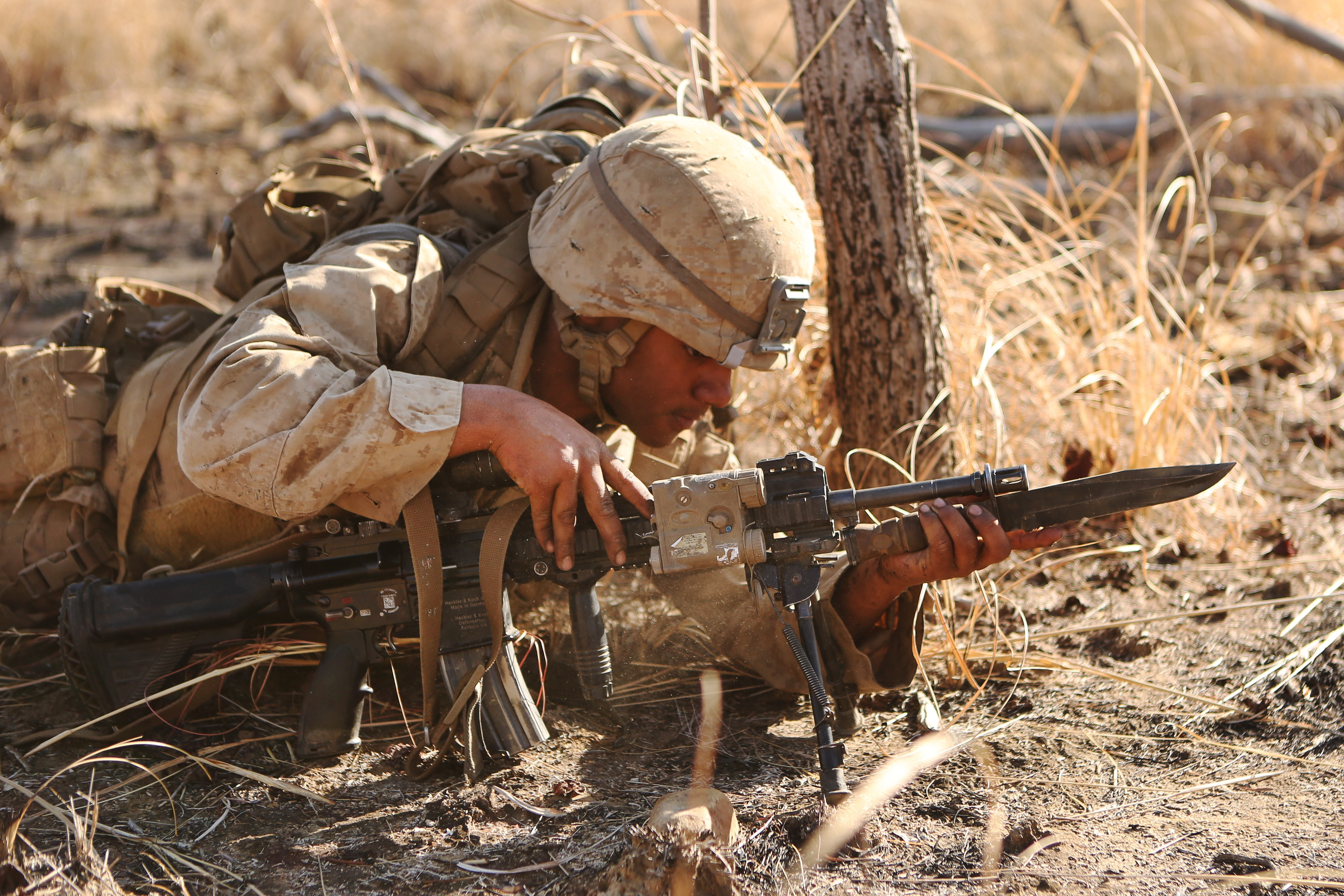
US Marine attaches bayonet to his M27 IAR with a AN/PEQ-16 attached.

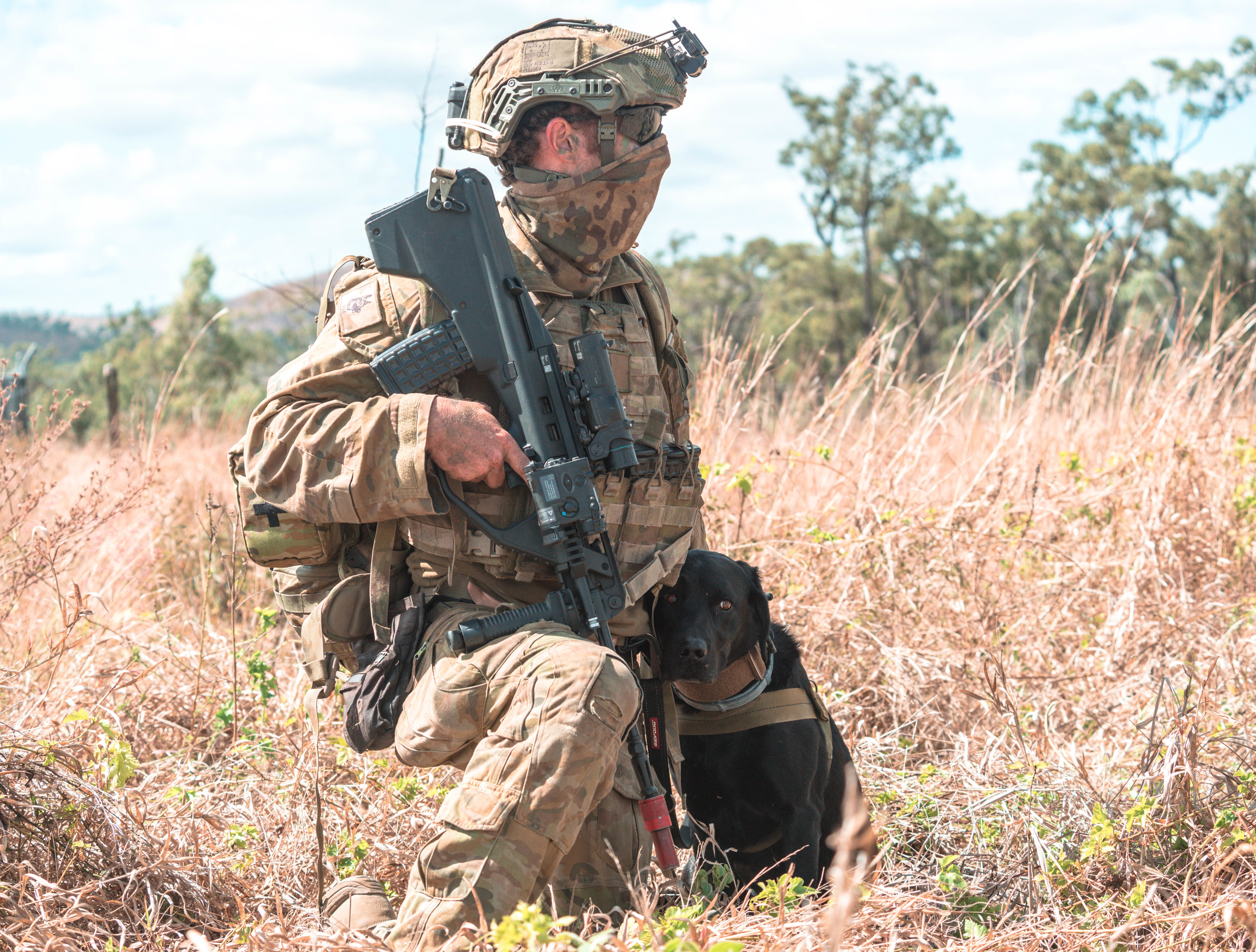
Australian Army dog handler with a AN/PEQ-16 attached to his rifle.

The AN/PEQ-16 is operated using a main mode selector dial located on the top of the unit, with 9 options, each mode corresponds to a single, or a dual combination of functions, these modes are detailed in the table below. Once the mode has been selected, the activation of the pressure pad activates the function selected. The unit has an inbuilt switch, but it also has a remote cable switch socket to allow for a remote pressure pad to be located elsewhere on the rifle.

DIAL POSITION	MODE	DESCRIPTION
A	AIM	Visible Aim Laser ON
L	LIGHT	White light Illuminator ON
D	DUAL	Visible aim laser & White Light Illuminator ON
O	OFF	Prevents inadvertent laser burst
P	Program	Sets the desired IR pulse rate
AL	AIM LOW	IR Aiming Laser set to LOW
DL	DUAL LOW	IR Aiming Laser and Illuminator set to LOW
AH	AIM HIGH	IR Aiming Laser set to HIGH
DH	DUAL HIGH	IR Aiming Laser and IR Illuminator set to HIGH

== Comparative Specifications ==
The table below show the specification of the AN/PEQ-16 (right) compared with the AN/PEQ-15.

	AN/PEQ-15	AN/PEQ-16
Manufacturer	L3Harris	L3Harris
Dimensions	117 × 71 × 41 mm / 4.6" × 2.8" × 1.6" (L×W×H)	104 × 81 × 43 mm / 4.1" × 3.2" × 1.7" (L×W×H)
Weight	213 g (7.5 oz) w/ battery	281 g (9.9 oz) w/ battery
Power	1× CR123A 3-Volt battery	2× CR123A 3-Volt batteries
Battery Life	>6 hours (in Dual High DH setting)	4 hours Normal operation (≥ 30 mins of continuous white light use)
Waterproof	6 m (20 ft) for 1 hour	6 m (20 ft) for 1 hour
Visible Laser
Class	IIIR	IIIR
Output	5.0 mW	4.0 mW
Divergence	0.5 mrad	0.5 mrad
Wavelength	Red (635 ± 15 nm)	Red (635 ± 30 nm)
Range	Day: >25 m (82 ft) (Note: Not in direct sunlight)	Day: >25 m (82 ft)
IR Laser
Class	IIIR (Low), IIIB (High)	IIIR (Low), IIIB (High)
Output	Low: 0.7 mW High: 27.5 mW	Low: 0.6 mW High: 25 mW
Divergence	0.5 mrad	0.5 mrad
Wavelength	(835 ± 15 nm)	(840 ± 20 nm)
Range	Low: >600 m (1,969 ft) High: 2,000 m (6,562 ft)	Low: >600 m (1,969 ft) High: 2,000 m (6,562 ft)
IR Illuminator
Class	IIIB	IIIB
Output	Low: 3.5 mW High: 45 mW	Low: 3.5 mW High: 30 mW
Divergence	1—105 mrad (Adjustable lens)	1—105 mrad (Adjustable lens)
Wavelength	(835 ± 15 nm)	(840 ± 20 nm)
Range	Low: >600 m (1,969 ft) High: 2,000 m (6,562 ft)	Low: >600 m (1,969 ft) High: 2,000 m (6,562 ft)
White Light Illuminator
Output Power	None	>125 lumens
Type	None	LED

== Operators ==
- Australia: AN/PEQ-16B supplemented at the squad level with the L3Harris Squad Rangefinder (SRF).
- United States: In use by the USMC and also fairly limited use in the US Army.
- United Kingdom

== Availability ==
As with a lot of military technology and accessories developed in the U.S., infrared lasers, including the PEQ-16, are controlled by the International Traffic in Arms Regulations (ITAR), and as such, export is restricted without approval from the Department of State. Furthermore as a 'class IIIB' IR laser pointer, under FDA regulations, sales of the PEQ-16 are generally restricted to government and law enforcement agencies and units.

== See also ==
- Joint Electronics Type Designation System – Unclassified designation system for United States military electronic equipment
- List of military electronics of the United States
