= Insight Technology =

Optical device manufacturer

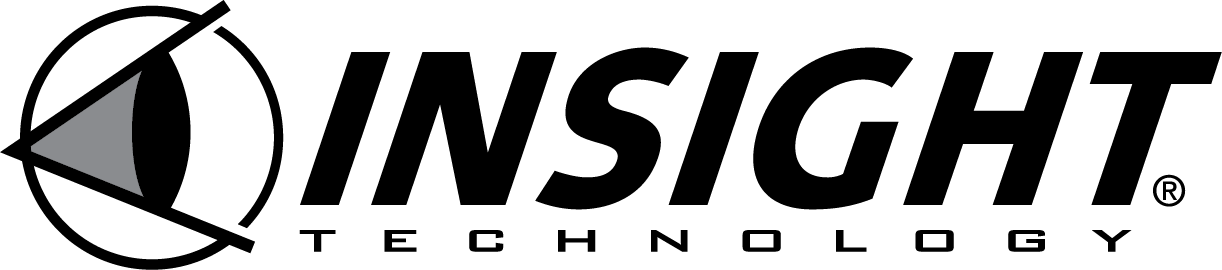
- Industry: Arms industry
- Products: Firearm accessories, tactical lights, optical devices, telescopic sights, laser sights

Insight Technology, Inc. is an optical device manufacturer based in Londonderry, New Hampshire, USA.

Insight Technology builds firearm accessories such as tactical flashlights and laser aiming modules, for military and civilian markets. The company is best known for making the AN/PEQ-2 and AN/PEQ-6 laser sights used by some branches of the United States armed forces, as well as the LA-5/PEQ for the Special Operations Peculiar MODification (SOPMOD) Block II.

== History ==
Insight was acquired by L3 Technologies in 2010.

== Tactical Products ==
Insight XTI Procyon Tactical Light

The Insight XTI Procyon is a tactical light designed to mount on the accessory rail. The light is provided by a 125 lumen LED, and the housing is made of anodized aluminum. The XTI Procyon is water resistant to 15 feet.

Insight ISM Integrated Sighting Module

The Insight Integrated Sighting Module (ISM) is a non-magnified red dot sight equipped with an integral infrared target illumination laser and visible laser sight. The ISM was originally produced in tandem with the XM8 Assault Rifle, with the intention of becoming a standard attachment. However, even as the XM8 project was cancelled, Insight continued development of the ISM sight until it was released in early 2007. The ISM can fit any MIL-STD 1913 rail.
