= Laser sight =

Laser device used to assist the aiming of a firearm

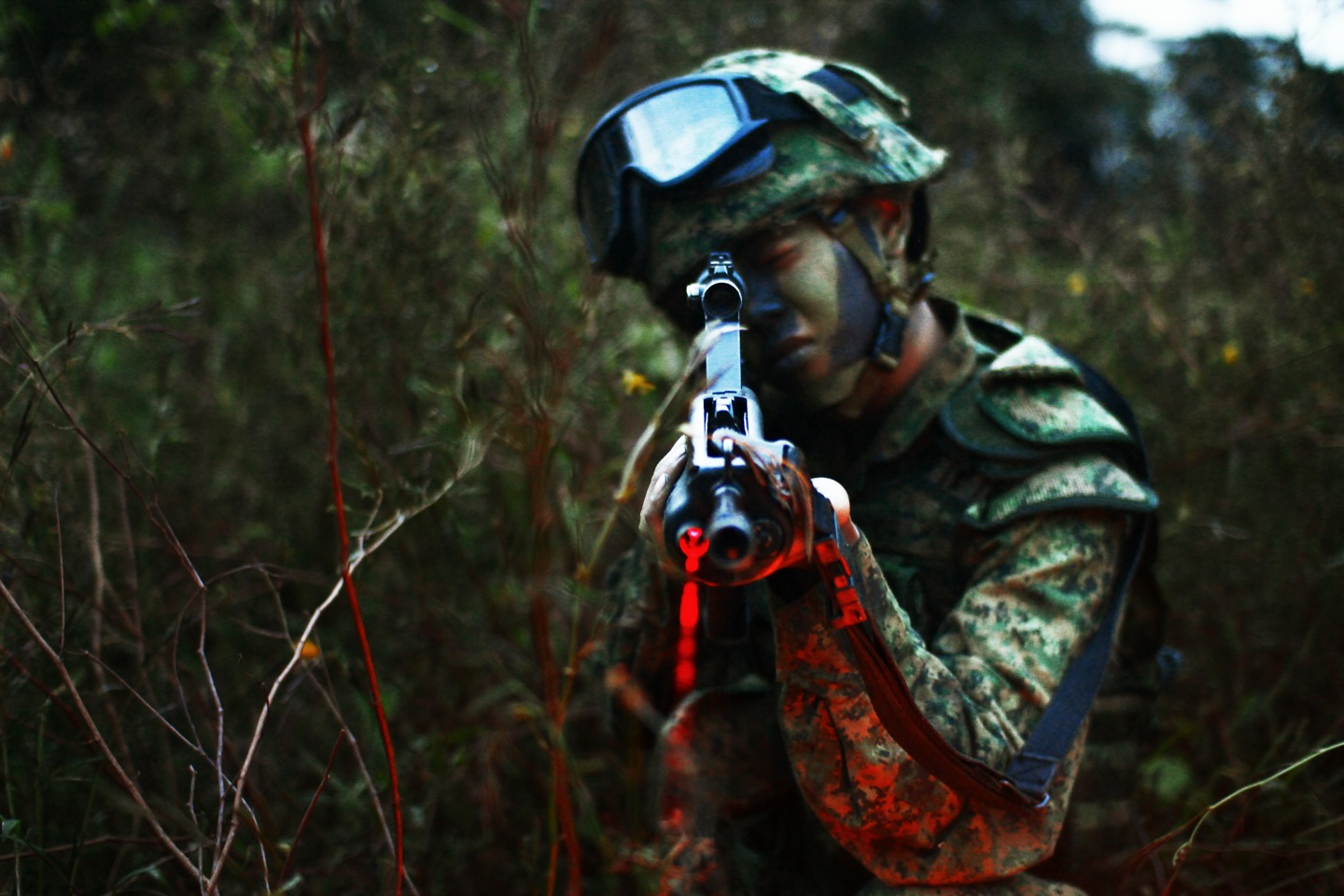
Singaporean soldier aiming a SAR 21 with laser sight

A laser sight is a device attached or integral to a firearm to aid target acquisition. Unlike optical and iron sights where the user looks through the device to aim at the target, laser sights project a beam onto the target, providing a visual reference point.

Although lasers in the visible part of the spectrum are most common, invisible infrared (IR) lasers may be used in conjunction with a night vision device. As they are offset from the barrel, laser sights need to be zeroed in, much like a conventional sight, so that the beam intercepts the point of impact at a chosen distance. Devices may include one or both types of laser, with some models also incorporating a rangefinder, flashlight, or IR illuminator. Laser sights may be attached to the existing sighting mechanism, the trigger guard, via a rail system, or can be integrated into replacement components such as the guide rod or grip plates. Some variants are also incorporated into other attachments such as foregrips.

Laser sights are primarily used by military and law enforcement, although have some civilian use for hunting and self defense. They are also found on some less-lethal weapons, such as Taser electroshock weapons.

== History ==
The laser sight was first brought to market by the American International Corp. in 1974, it was sold alongside the American 180 and featured a Helium-Neon laser. The first largely sold firearm laser was sold by Laser Products Corporation (today known as SureFire) in 1979. The design was patented in 1978 by Surefire founder Dr. John Matthews, a pioneer in the field of photonics, and his business partner Ed Reynolds. The ruggedized helium-neon gas laser was custom built into the extended Pachmayr grip of a .357 Magnum Colt Trooper and fed by a rechargeable 12-volt battery. The popularity of this new product among SWAT and special forces led Laser Products Corp. to design and produce similar laser sights for other firearms employed by military and law enforcement such as the Colt M16, Remington 870, H&K MP5, and Ruger Mini-14.

Laser sights were popularized outside of military and law enforcement when Laser Products fitted The Terminator's iconic weapon, a .45 Longslide pistol, with a custom He-Ne laser. Another example was the iMatronic LS45. Today, most modern laser sights are solid-state lasers, as opposed to the original gas design. Modern weapon-mounted lasers and combat lights produced by SureFire continue to be widely used by the US military, its allies, and law enforcement.

== Purpose ==
=== Benefits ===
==== Accuracy ====
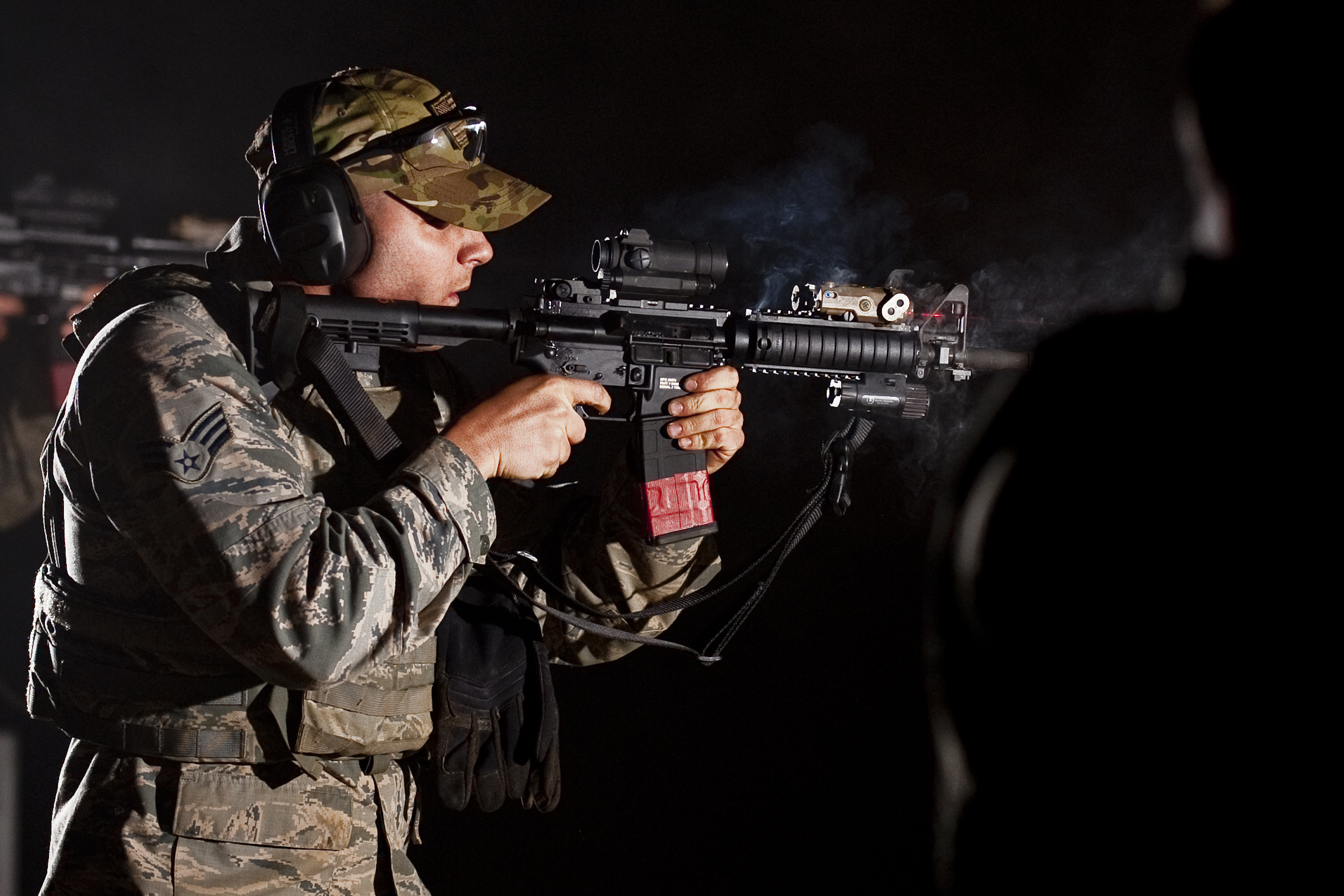
A USAF Airman using an M4 carbine with an AN/PEQ-15 laser sight

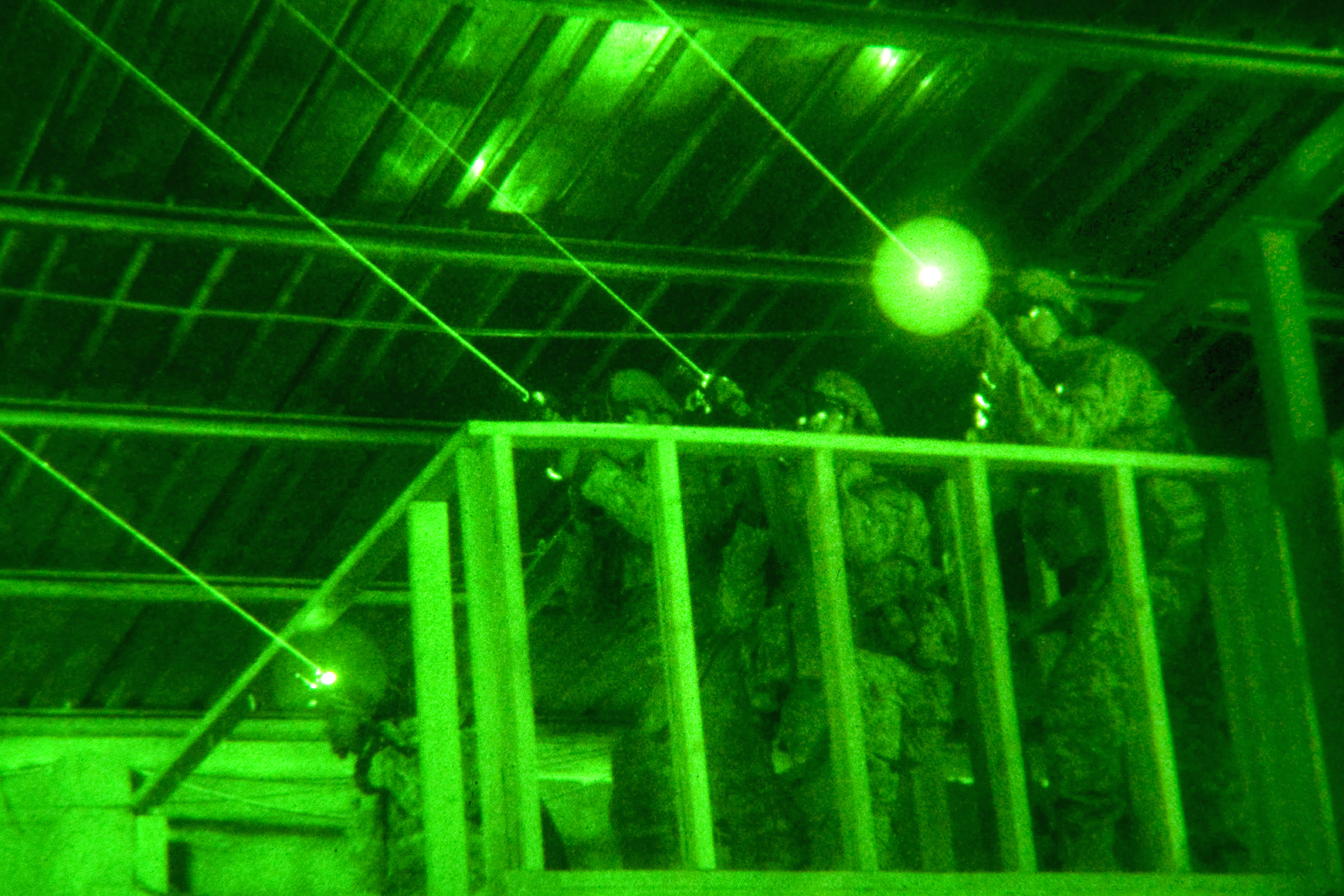
U.S. Army 82nd Airborne Division using IR laser sights seen through a night vision device on a training exercise in Iraq

The use of laser sights is associated with increased accuracy in general, increasing the probability of hitting the target especially in low light conditions. The projected dot speeds up target acquisition, decreasing the time required for the shooter to aim and fire, as well as decreasing the time necessary for follow-up shots. Laser sights also aid in point shooting, where the shooter relies on hand eye coordination rather than aiming with a traditional sight, this most often occurs and is taught when conducting CQM (close quarters marksmanship) or urban operations where engagement distances are less than 15 m (49 ft), and the shooter is operating in confined spaces. This is of particular use when the user does not have time or is unable to obtain a proper sight picture before firing; for example, the use of ballistic shields or gas masks may obstruct access to the sights. Lasers also increase accuracy when shooting from an unconventional stance.

==== Training ====
Laser sights are also a useful training aid. They allow users to practice dry-fire drills while being able to see the point of impact: this has significant safety benefits. Training with laser sights has been shown to improve shooting skills faster, although both instructors and manufacturers recommended that users continue training without lasers to avoid becoming dependent on them.

==== Deescalation ====
By providing a visual indication of where the gun is aimed, laser sights add an extra factor of intimidation. Studies of law enforcement indicate that suspects faced with laser sights are significantly more likely to surrender, even if they themselves are armed.

==== Use with Night Vision Devices ====
IR (infrared) lasers can be used with night vision devices, as the bulk of a head-mounted night vision device makes aiming with iron sights or a conventional optic difficult. These lasers cannot be seen by the naked eye and are only visible when utilizing night vision devices. Some IR laser units, like the AN/PEQ-2, utilize two separate lasers: a narrow "aiming" laser and a more diffuse "illuminator". The aiming laser is used to estimate point of impact, while the illuminator is used to better visualize targets and the environment through the night vision device. However, even with laser sights, shot groupings are still inferior to those achieved in daytime, and the degree of improvement is highly dependent on correct set up of the system.

=== Drawbacks ===
==== Long range accuracy ====
Where a laser beam travels in a straight line, the path of a bullet gradually deviates after it leaves the barrel due to external forces such as gravity, wind, and even the rotation of the earth. This is a significant issue for long distance shooting; shorter range weapons such as handguns are less affected. Another related issue is that the beam widens over distance, meaning that instead of projecting a small dot, a much larger circle may be produced.

==== Visibility in bright light ====
Visibility of laser sights deteriorates in bright light. Green lasers are more effective in bright conditions, however they are more complex to produce so are often larger and more expensive than red lasers.

==== Aerial targets ====
Laser sights cannot be used for hunting flying game in the daylight, as neither the beam nor dot are visible. A further risk to aircraft is also an issue, as even civilian grade lasers are capable of hitting a plane from 2 miles away.

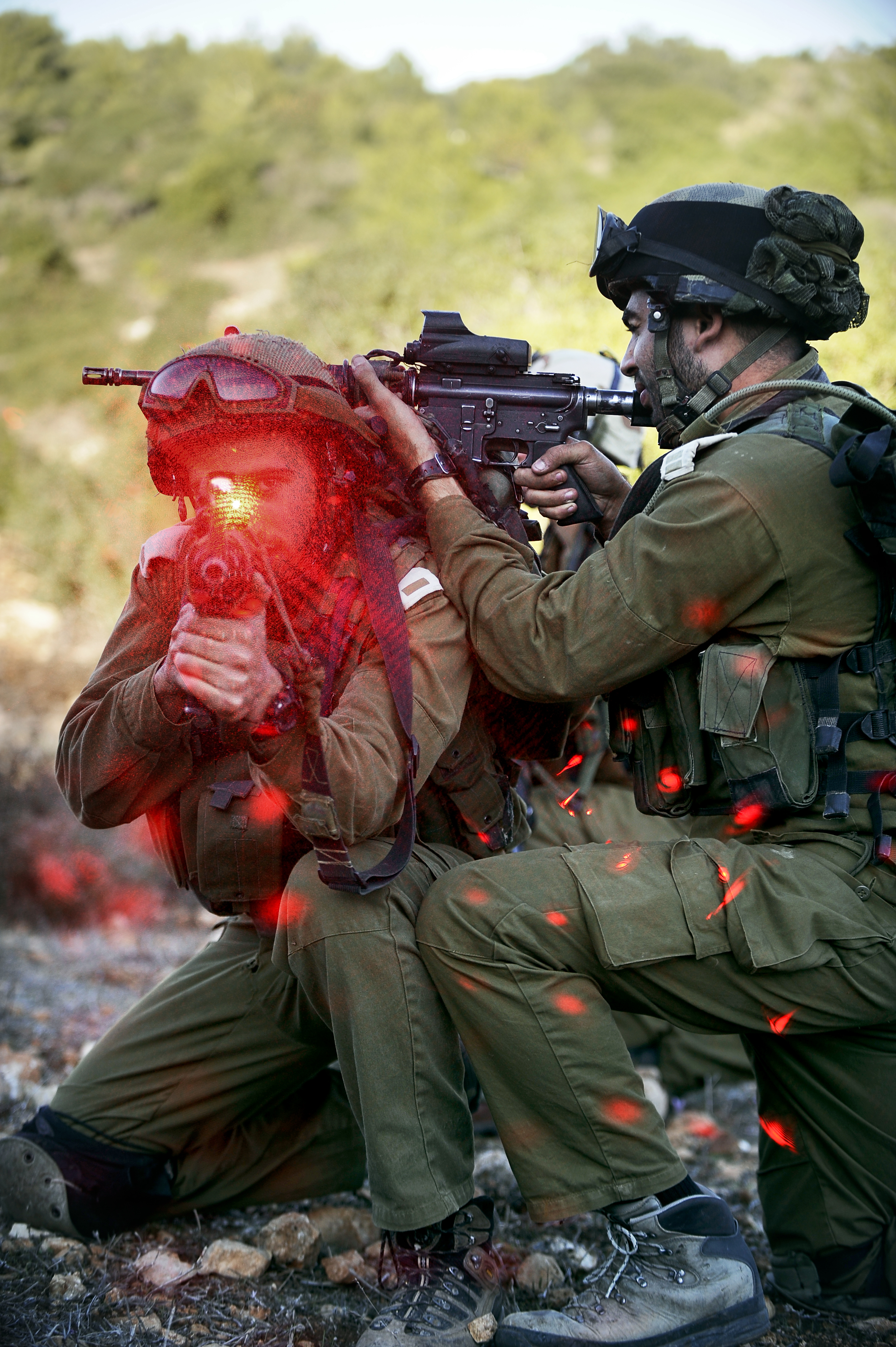
Israel Defence Forces using laser sights in training

==== Batteries ====
Laser sights rely on batteries to work. As such, they require regular maintenance and may fail during use. Non-water resistant models also risk electrical damage through water ingress.

==== Added mass ====
As with all firearms attachments, laser sights add mass to the firearm. This is particularly significant for handguns, as many holsters aren't designed to accommodate them.

==== Risk of eye damage ====
Lasers can easily cause damage to the eyes. Visible lasers are unlikely to cause permanent damage due to the blink reflex, however IR lasers do not trigger this and thus pose a significant risk.

==== Revealing position ====
The use of laser sights poses a risk in tactical scenarios as they may reveal the user's location, although this can be mitigated by only turning on the laser when needed. An additional consideration for military and law enforcement is whether the enemy has night vision capabilities; if so, IR lasers will be visible to them.

==== Difficulty zeroing ====
Laser sights are somewhat more difficult to zero than conventional sighting systems. IR lasers in particular can take in excess of an hour to properly zero, depending on the methods used.

== Boresights ==
Laser boresights differ from laser sights in that they are not intended, or capable, of being used at the same time as the firearm; instead, they are intended to aid in zeroing the firearm. A boresight is a laser in the shape of a cartridge. The user chambers a boresight of the appropriate calibre which projects a laser beam directly down the barrel, providing a visual indicator of the point of impact at a given range. The user then adjusts the sights until they align with the dot. Boresighting suffers from the same weakness as laser sights in that while the beam is straight, the path of the bullet curves; as such it is not a substitute for traditional zeroing, rather they serve to speed up the process.

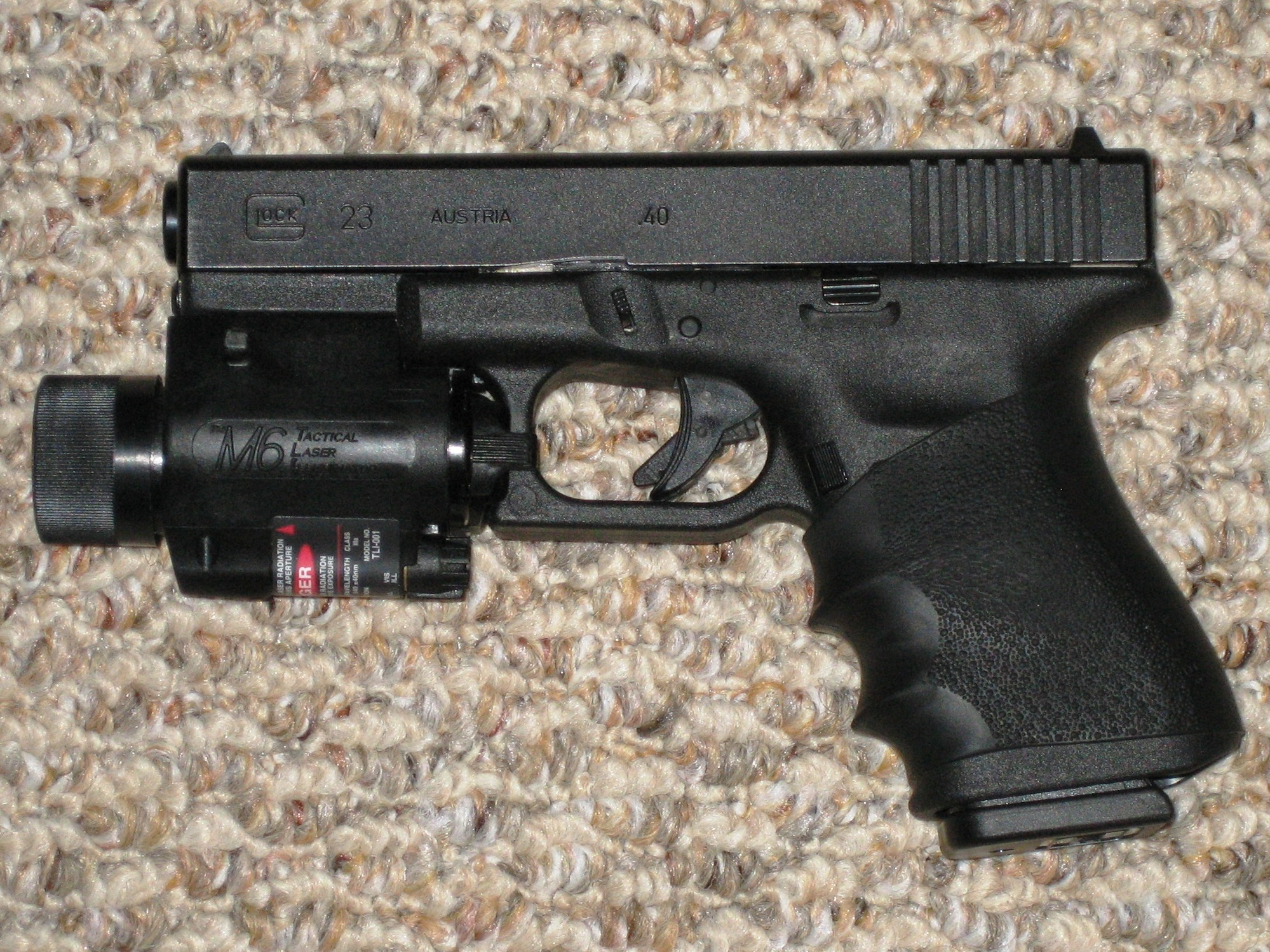
Glock 23 with Insight M6 dual flashlight and laser sight

== Legality ==
Restrictions on laser sights vary by jurisdiction. Another consideration is the legality of the laser itself: the power output of military and law enforcement devices often exceed that permitted for civilian use.

=== US ===
In the US, laser sights are mostly legal for self-defense purposes, however their use for hunting is more strictly regulated.

=== UK ===
UK firearms legislation does not mention accessories such as laser sights. There are no restrictions on using laser sights on rifles at a range.

== Users ==
=== U.S. police ===
In a 2019 survey of US police officers, less than 13% used laser sights on duty, with only 32% saying that their agency permitted their use.

== See also ==
- AN/PEQ-2
- AN/PEQ-15
- AN/PEQ-16
- AN/PEQ-6
- Crimson Trace
- Insight Technology
- L3Harris
