= AN/TPS-32 =

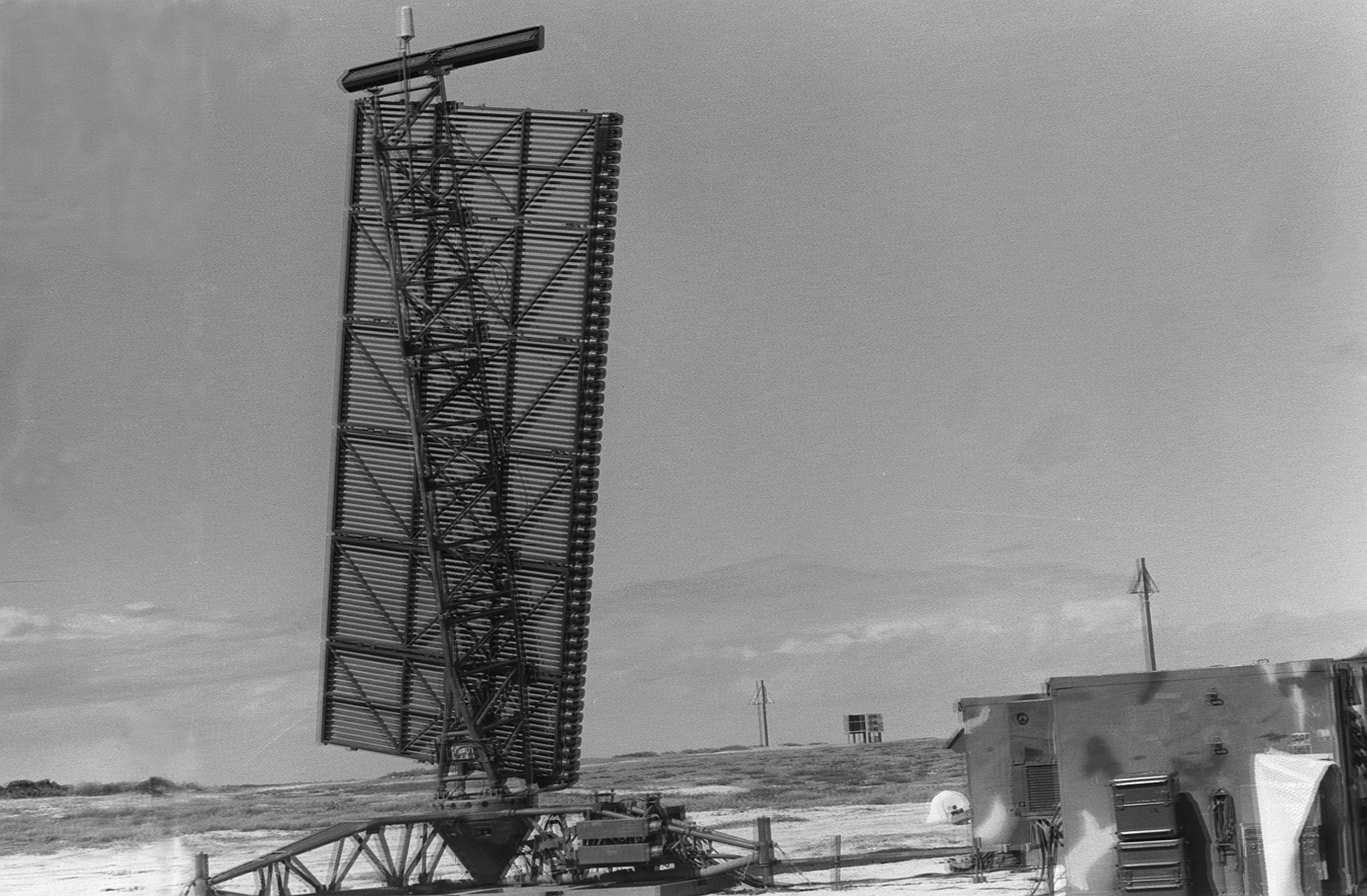
- USMC AN/TPS-32 conducting operations during Exercise Kernel Blitz in January 1984.
- Country of origin: United States
- Manufacturer: ITT Gilfillan
- Introduced: 1969
- Frequency: S Band
- Beamwidth: 2.15° (horizontal), .84° (vertical)
- RPM: 6
- Range: 300+ miles
- Azimuth: <360º

AN/TPS-32 was a three-dimensional, tactical long-range surveillance radar operated by the United States Marine Corps from the early 1970s through the early 1990s. Developed by ITT Gilfillan in Van Nuys, California, the radar was the primary sensor for the Marine Corps' Tactical Air Operations Center (TAOC) and was optimized to work in concert with the MIM-23 Hawk Missile System and the Marine Tactical Data System.

In accordance with the Joint Electronics Type Designation System (JETDS), the "AN/TPS-32" designation represents the 32nd design of an Army-Navy electronic device for ground transportable search radar system. The JETDS system also now is used to name all Department of Defense electronic systems.

== Development ==
Development of the AN/TPS-32 began with the United States Navy's Bureau of Ships in the 1950s. It was meant to be a next generation, mobile radar capable of supporting Marine Corps forces during amphibious operations.

The TPS-32 was a major improvement in radar technology for the Marine Corps. It was the service's second three dimensional radar providing range, azimuth and altitude from one array thus precluding the need for a separate Height-finder radar. Unlike the old mechanically scanned arrays that utilized analog technology, the TPS-32 was 90% digital, solid-state electronics possessing a phased Antenna array. Also new for the design of this radar was the use of three crossed-field amplifiers as the microwave amplifiers in the very-high-power transmitter. They replaced the cavity magnetrons utilized on earlier radar sets.

The AN/TPS-32 was delivered to Marine Air Control Squadron 3 (MACS-3) in 1969 for final operational testing. MACS-3 was re-designated as the Marine Corps Tactical Systems Support Activity (MCTSSA) in 1970 and continued testing. The radar entered service in the Fleet Marine Force in 1972.

In the 1980s, the Marine Corps began to seek a replacement for both the AN/TPS-32 and MTDS. Development continued throughout the 1980s at Marine Air Control Squadron 1 (MACS-1). Following the Gulf War, the TPS-32 was retired without replacement.

== Units that utilized the TPS-32 ==
- MACS-2
- MACS-4
- MACS-5
- MACS-6
- MACS-7
- MACS-24
- Marine Corps Tactical Systems Support Activity

== See also ==
- List of AN/TPS- radar systems
- List of radars
- United States Marine Corps aviation
- List of United States Marine Corps aviation support units
- List of military electronics of the United States
