= Tactical Air Operations Center =

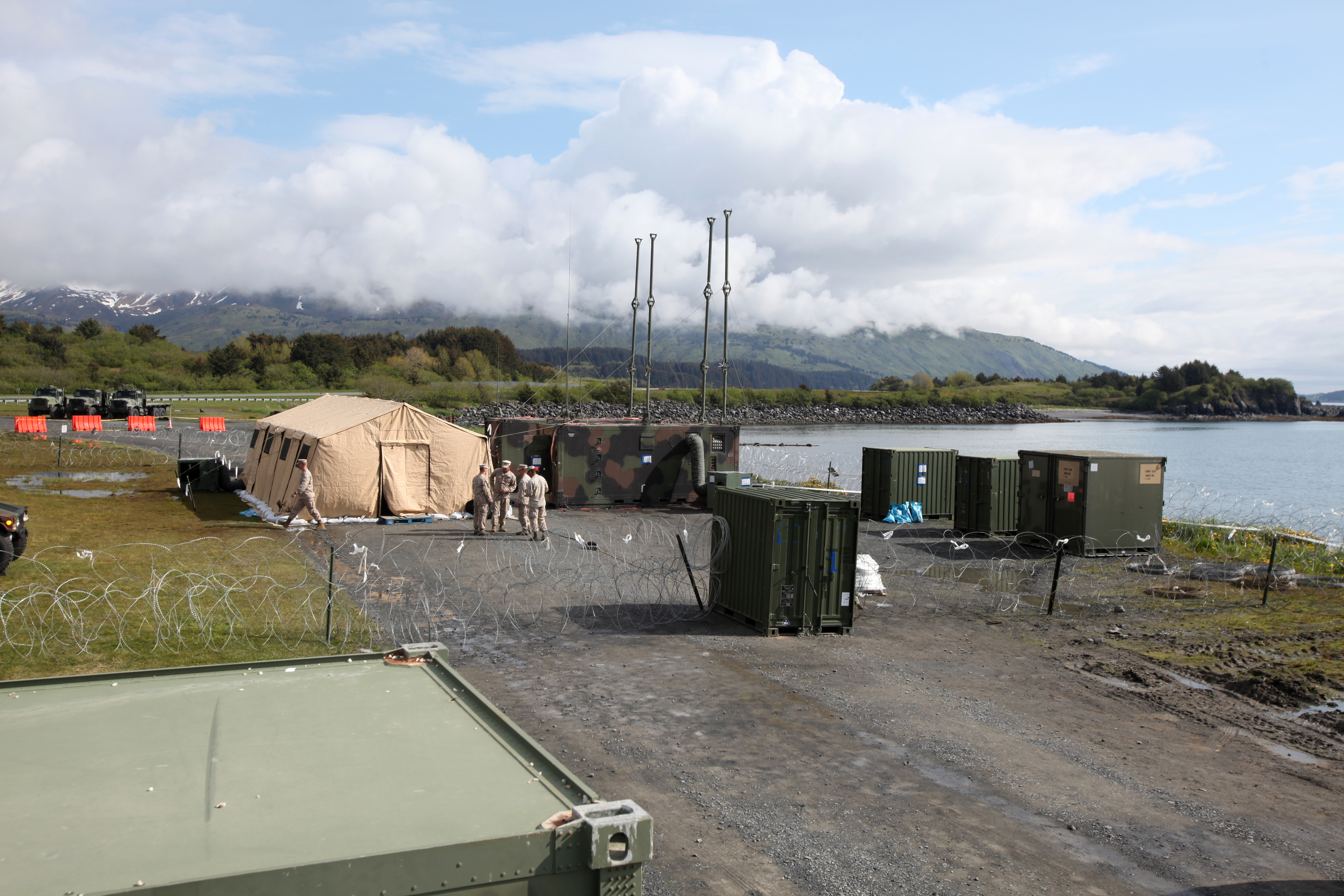
A TAOC established by MACS-1 in Alaska supporting Exercise Northern Edge 11.

The Tactical Air Operations Center (TAOC) is the principal air defense agency of the United States Marine Corps' Marine Air Ground Task Force (MAGTF). The TAOC provides real time aerial surveillance of assigned airspace, and its personnel identify, and control the intercept of hostile aircraft and missiles. It also directs and controls all Surface-to-air missiles in the MAGTF's area of operations.

== Mission ==
Provide air surveillance and control of friendly aircraft and surface-to-air weapons in support of offensive air support and anti-air warfare, continuous all-weather radar, non-radar, tower air traffic control services, airspace management, and meteorological and oceanographic (METOC) services in support of the MAGTF and Joint Force Commander.

== Tasks ==
All Marine Corps tactical control agencies are assigned Mission Essential Tasks (METs) that define what that agency is expected to execute. These METs are broken down into two categories: core and core plus. Core METs are those tasks which the agency is expected to be able to do at all times. Core plus METs are tasks that the agency must be able to provide on an as needed basis. These METs are standardized across all units and are reported monthly to the Defense Readiness Reporting System for tracking. The TAOC is responsible for the following Mission Essential Tasks:

Core

- Conduct airspace surveillance
- Conduct positive control
- Coordinate air and missile defense actions
- Conduct dual site air and missile defense operations

Core Plus

- Integrate operational air defense capabilities

== Background ==
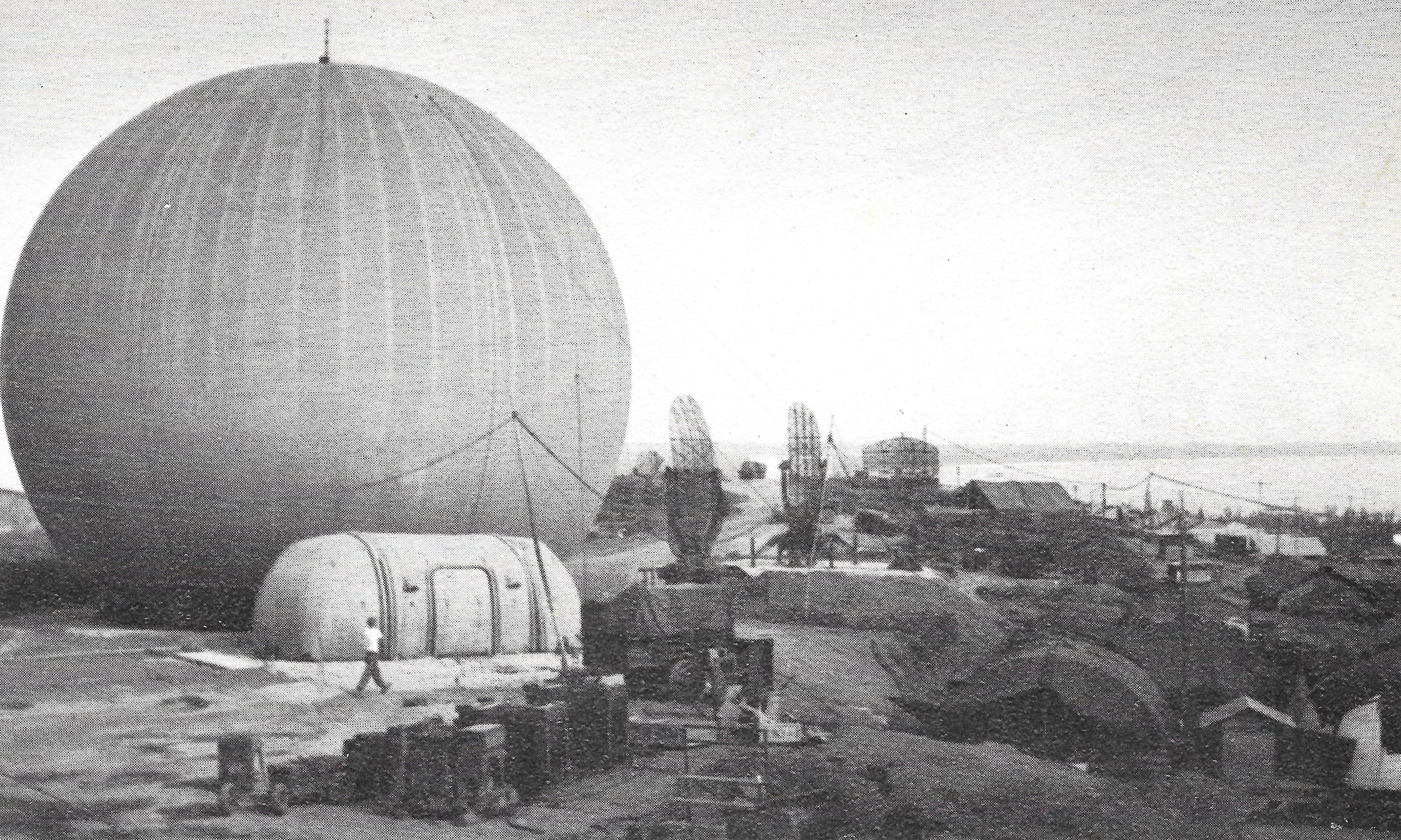
MACS-7 CAOC established on the beach at Chu Lai Air Base.

During the 1950s, Marine Air Control Squadrons utilized the Counter Air Operations Center (CAOC) as the primary agency responsible for coordinating air defense in support of Marine Corps Forces. Primary and secondary radars provided track data to AN/UPA-25 radar scope operators in the CAOC. This information was passed via intercom to system plotters who then manually displayed the information on Plexiglass display boards within the system. This manpower intensive system was not too different from how the Marine Corps first early warning detachments operated during World War II.

In the early 1950s the Navy began to develop the Naval Tactical Data System with the goal of sharing track data from multiple sensors across the fleet and with land based Marine Corps units using tactical data links such as Link-11/TADIL-A. Faster aircraft and more accurate weapons required an automated system to enhance controllers' situational awareness to aid them in making faster decisions. To that end, the Marine Corps began developing the Marine Tactical Data System (MTDS) in the late 1950s. MTDS became the Marine Corps' first semi-automated system capable of collecting, processing, computing and displaying aircraft surveillance data while also sharing that information with other participating units via tactical data link.

== History ==
=== Vietnam War ===
The acronym TAOC came into use in the Marine Corps in 1965 with the fielding of the Marine Tactical Data System. MTDS consisted of three major components that worked in concert to automate early warning, fighter direction and the control of surface to air missiles. Under MTDS, air defense within the Marine Corps was combined into a new agency known as the Tactical Air Operations Center (TAOC). The TAOC automated air defense functions which up to that point had to be completed manually. Operators could control more than 20 simultaneous intercepts while the computer tracked up to 250 air targets.

Marine Air Control Squadron 4 was the first unit to utilize a TAOC in combat when it was established at the Monkey Mountain Facility on Monkey Mountain east of Danang. The squadron began operations on July 6, 1967. MACS-4 provided positive radar control for the Marine Corps' area of operations in the I Corps Tactical Zone. On January 13, 1971, at 0001, MACS-4 made its last tactical transmission in support of operations during the Vietnam War. During its time in Vietnam utilizing MTDS, MACS-4 controlled or assisted 472,146 aircraft.

=== The Gulf War ===
Iraq's August 1990 invasion of Kuwait set off hostilities throughout Southwest Asia because of this MACS-2 arrived in Saudi Arabia and established a TAOC in the vicinity of King Abdul Aziz Naval Base (KAANB). MACS-1 participated in Operation Desert Shield from August until October 1990. At that time the majority of the squadron returned to MCB Camp Pendleton however a detachment with an AN/TPS-59 long range radar and Tactical Air Operations Module (TAOM) remained in Saudi Arabia in support of MACS-2. On December 29, 1990, MACS-2 relocated its TAOC eight miles west of Ras Mishab. From this location it supported I Marine Expeditionary Force. At the beginning of the ground invasion, the squadron sent an Early Warning and Control (EW/C) site to Ahmad al-Jaber Air Base in the Kingdom of Kuwait to push its radar coverage area further north.

=== Iraq & Afghanistan ===
On February 11, 2003, MACS-1's main body arrived in Kuwait during the buildup of forces prior to the 2003 invasion of Iraq. The MACS-1 TAOC was established at TAA Coyote and began operating 24-hours a day on February 22 while in support of Operation Southern Watch. The MACS-1 TAOC supported combat operations against Iraq beginning on March 19 and continuing through June 12, 2003, when the Combined Air Operations Center released the squadron from its tasking. The TAOC did not displace during combat operations in 2003. The Early Warning and Control (EW/C) Detachment from MACS-2 went north into Iraq to provide additional radar coverage first from Jalibah Southeast Air Base followed by An Numaniyah.

From 2009 through 2014, MACS-1, in concert with MACS-2, supported sustained TAOC operations at Camp Leatherneck, in Helmand Province, Afghanistan. MACS-2 first brought the TAOC and AN/TPS-59 radar into Helmand Province in 2009 replacing the Royal Air Force's No. 1 Air Control Centre. MACS-1 & MACS-2 were responsible for controlling 70,000 square miles of airspace in support of Regional Command Southwest operations. From 2009 through 2014, both squadrons combined coordinated more than 320,000 fixed-wing operations, 80,000 aerial refueling operations, and more than 7,000 rotary wing operations. The TAOC's mission in Afghanistan ended in November 2014 as the Marine Corps withdrew its presence in Southern Afghanistan and turned over control of the area to United States Air Force's 71st Expeditionary Air Control Squadron.

== Equipment ==
Long Range Early Warning Radars

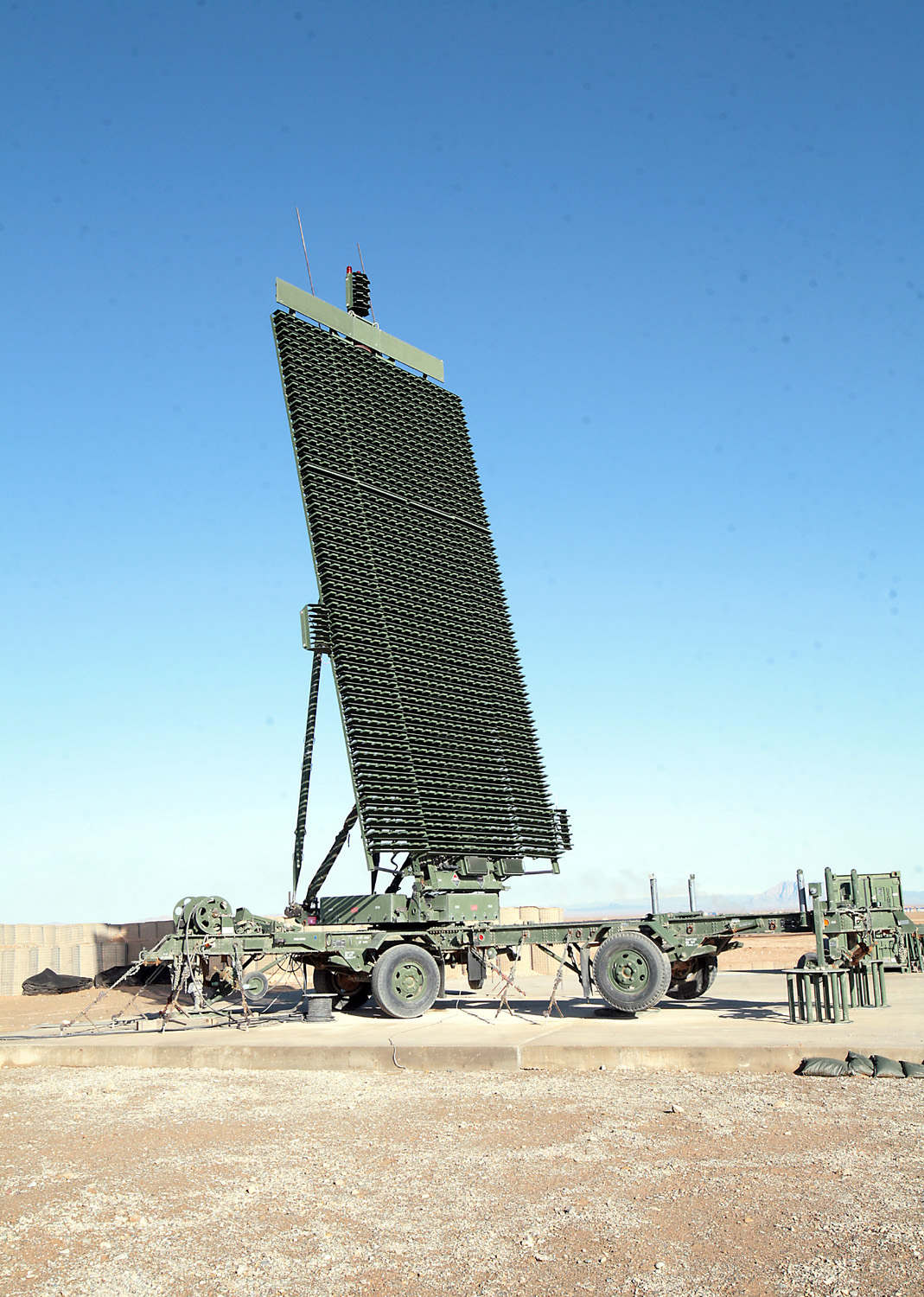
The AN/TPS-59 (V)3 Ballistic Missile Defense Radar in Afghanistan.

AN/TPS-80 Ground/Air Task Oriented Radar at Marine Corps Air Station Yuma

- AN/TPS-32 (1969 - early 1990s)
  - Three-dimensional, tactical long-range surveillance radar operated from the early 1970s through the early 1990s.
- AN/TPS-59 (mid-1980s - 2021)
  - L-band active electronically scanned array (AESA) 3-dimensional air search radar first produced by GE Aerospace in 1980 and now part of Lockheed Martin.
- AN/TPS-80 (G/ATOR) (2016–Present)
  - Three-dimensional, multi-mode, gallium nitride (GaN) Active Electronically Scanned Array (AESA) with 360-degree coverage. It was developed by Northrop Grumman and initially fielded in August 2016. It remains the primary sensor for the TAOC.

Other radars fielded

- AN/TPS-63 - Medium range, Two-dimensional, L band radar system utilized by the United States Marine Corps from the early 1980s until finally retired in 2018.

C2 Systems

- Marine Tactical Data System (1965 - Early 1990s) - mobile, ground based, aviation command and control system developed by the United States Marine Corps for the execution of anti-air warfare in support of the Fleet Marine Force (FMF). It was the service's first semi-automated system capable of collecting, processing, computing, and displaying aircraft surveillance data while also sharing that information with other participating units via tactical data link.
- AN/TYQ-23 Tactical Air Operations Module (TAOM) (1985 -
- Command Aviation Command and Control System (CAC2S) - primary aviation command and control system utilized by the Marine Air Command and Control System(MACCS). CAC2S' software fuses inputs from both Marine Corps, joint, and coalition sensors and data sources to provide increased real-time situational awareness for the integration of MAGTF aviation and ground operations.

== Current Units ==
Squadron Name	Insignia	Nickname	Date Commissioned	Senior Command	Station
MACS-1		Falconers	September 1, 1943	MACG-38, 3d MAW	MCAS Yuma, AZ
MACS-2		Eyes of the MAGTF	April 1, 1944	MACG-28, 2d MAW	MCAS Cherry Point, NC
MACS-4		Vice Squad	May 5, 1944	MACG-18, 1st MAW	MCAS Futenma, Okinawa, Japan
MACS-24		Earthquake	October 15, 1949	MACG-48, 4th MAW	Virginia Beach, VA

== See also ==
- Direct Air Support Center
