= AN/TRC-97 =

Cold War-era US military multiplexed radio

TRC-97 Communications System, setup for use

The AN/TRC-97 Radio Set, or TRC-97, is a radio set that has 12 multiplex channels, later expanded to 24 channels and 16 telegraph channels connected to an analog radio. The radio set is a mobile terminal that can transmit up to 40 miles (64 km) straight line-of-sight at up to 1 watt, using a traveling wave tube amplifier, or 96 miles (154 km) in tropospheric scatter at up to 1 kilowatt, using a tunable klystron amplifier, at a frequency range of 4.4 to 5 gigahertz and 1.2 to 2.2 gigahertz. The set has been manufactured by RCA in Camden, New Jersey.

In accordance with the Joint Electronics Type Designation System (JETDS), the "AN/TRC-97" designation represents the 97th design of an Army-Navy electronic device for ground transportable two-way communication radio system. The JETDS system also now is used to name all Department of Defense electronic systems.

The AN/TRC-97 project was instigated in 1962 as an ultra high frequency tropospheric scatter means of communication to support the Marine Tactical Data System. The preproduction model was delivered to the Marine Corps Base Quantico in late 1964 and underwent testing and evaluation until June 1967. In service it was used to provide, data voice and text communications between Tactical Air Operations Centers, Tactical Air Command Centers and MIM-23 Hawk missile batteries. The antennae of the system were targeted by communist forces during the Vietnam War but marines in the field found they could substitute them with 5-gallon coffee cans and still be able to communicate over 50 miles (80 km).

== Features ==
The TRC-97 can be connected to one of three mobile antennas, depending on the distance and signal strength needed. One such antenna that can be used with the TRC-97 is the MRT-2 parabolic tropospheric antenna, measuring 15 feet (4.6 m) across, which is designed to cover distances of up to 160 kilometres (99 mi). Another antenna was a simple feed horn type mounted on a 30 foot (9.1 m) pole. The third is a set of 8 foot (2.4 m) parabolic dishes on 15 feet (4.6 m) (pictured in the photo). These antennas are transported on trailers and have to be manually erected every time they are used, so knowledge of mechanics as well as electronics was needed to erect and maintain that equipment. The system was powered by a 3-cylinder diesel or later by a turbine generator (TG). A typical crew would consist of two or three wideband (Air Force) technicians and one power production (Air Force) technician to service the generator set. Two units could be used back to back to provide a relay capability for extra long haul traffic. This was usually done at the baseband level without need of any other equipment other than cables. It also could be remotely monitored from up to 2 miles (3.2 km) away using the BZ109 test and monitor set. This was accomplished by connecting a single pair of field wires (common military phone line). BZ109 would provide remote order wire, some basic measurements and alarm monitoring.

Three modes of propagation could be used: Tropospheric scatter, obstacle gain diffraction, and line-of-sight. Tropospheric Scatter and Obstacle Gain Diffraction typically used the 1 kW klystron while the line-of-sight mode used the 1W Traveling Wave Tube (TWT). The TWT was replaced late in the TRC-97’s life by a solid-state 1W amplifier.

The receiver of the TRC-97 can pick up very faint radio signals, as low as -105 dBm. The modified TRC-97A (with 12 channels of added multiplex) can receive signals as low as -102 dBm. It uses tunnel diodes, which utilize quantum mechanics theory, to amplify those low signals. The signals from two receivers are sent to a comparator, where they are compared, combined, or used separately, as necessary.

The TRC-97 Radio Set is small, as radio sets go. It is housed in a van approximately 5 feet 6 inches (1.68 m), and is delicately loaded onto a M1028 pickup truck. A trailer hauling a twin set of parabolic antennas and generator is usually pulled by the truck when it goes on its many maneuvers and deployments in support of the American defense system.

The TRC-97 was superseded by a more modern, less maintenance intensive, digital radio set called the AN/TRC-170.

== Users ==
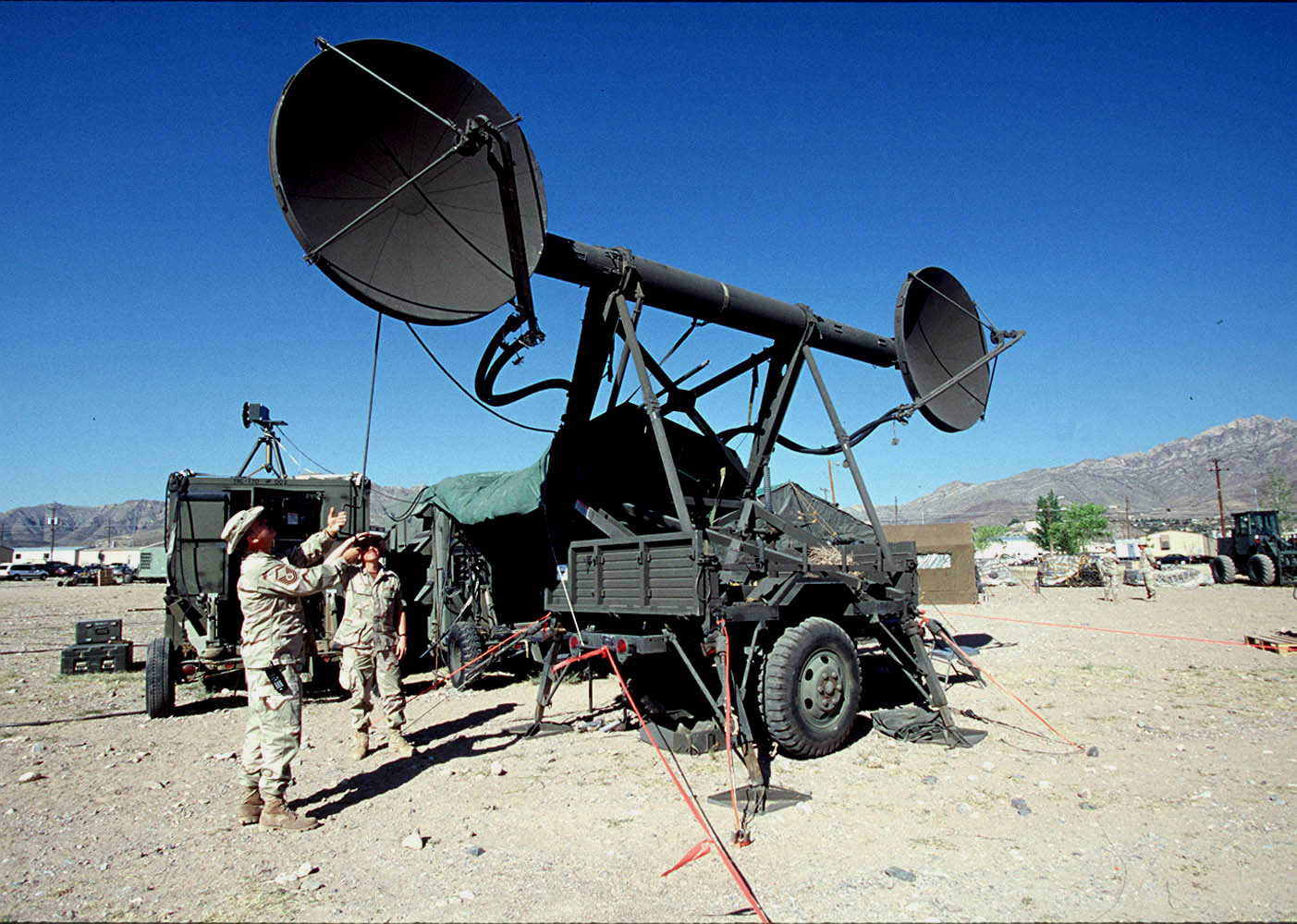
Two members of the 225th Combat Communications Squadron adjust the angle of the dish as they set up a TRAC-170 Wideband System for Exercise Roving Sands 97 at El Paso, Texas, on April 8, 1997.

The TRC-97 was initially made for the Marine Corps to help them with their military operations, such as the Vietnam War. It originally only had only 12 multiplex channels, but when the Air Force decided to use the equipment, they added an additional 12 channels in another module called the baby mux, next to the cabinet that houses the klystron. (This modification caused the equipment to be recognized as the TRC-97A.) Wired to voice channel 1 was a 16 channel teletype multiplexer. The Air Force had been using it for 20 years in the 1980s.

There are several military organizations that have used the TRC-97 and TRC-97A. One such organization was the 601st Tactical Control Wing, headquartered in Sembach Air Base, near Kaiserslautern, Germany, which has one of the largest concentrations of Americans outside of the United States. Also the 606 Tactical Control Squadron, Basdahl, GE outside of Bremerhaven, GE on the North Sea. There was also the 626 and 636 Tactical Control Flights along with the 601st, 602nd and 606th Tactical Control Squadrons fell under the 601st Tactical Control Wing, and military personnel assigned to those squadrons often went on deployment to various sites in Germany, thereby providing a show of force during the cold war.

The 602nd Tactical Control Squadron was located in Turkheim, Germany, a remote village in Bavaria. The nearest military installation was an Army installation in Neu Ulm, Germany. The 602nd Tactical Control Squadron closed in 1985, when the United States agreed to minimize their military presence in Germany.

The 728th Tactical Control Squadron was located at Duke Field (Field 3) associated with Eglin Air Force Base located near Fort Walton Fl. The 728 TCS was formerly based at Shaw AFB. the 728th TCS became later known as 728 ACS. Before the 728th, Duke Field was home to the 729th Tactical Control Squadron.

In the 1970s, several TRC-97s were turned over to Air National Guard bases stateside.

The 5th Tactical Control Group based at Clark Air Force Base in the Philippines used the TRC-97 extensively. The 5th TAC's mission was augmentation manning of SEA (Southeast Asia) radar installations. Many, if not most, of those missions were performed via TDY (temporary duty) support to Korea, Vietnam and surrounding areas during the Vietnam War. Most of these microwave links were used to provide communication links between the radar sites and the aircraft bases.

The 5th Combat Communications Group at Robins AFB GA was also a major user of the TRC-97 supporting many missions, one of 3 Combat Comm Groups in the US (the 3rd at Tinker AFB and the 2nd at Patrick AFB)

== See also ==
- List of military electronics of the United States
