= Richard E. Carey =

United States Marine Corps general (1928–2025)

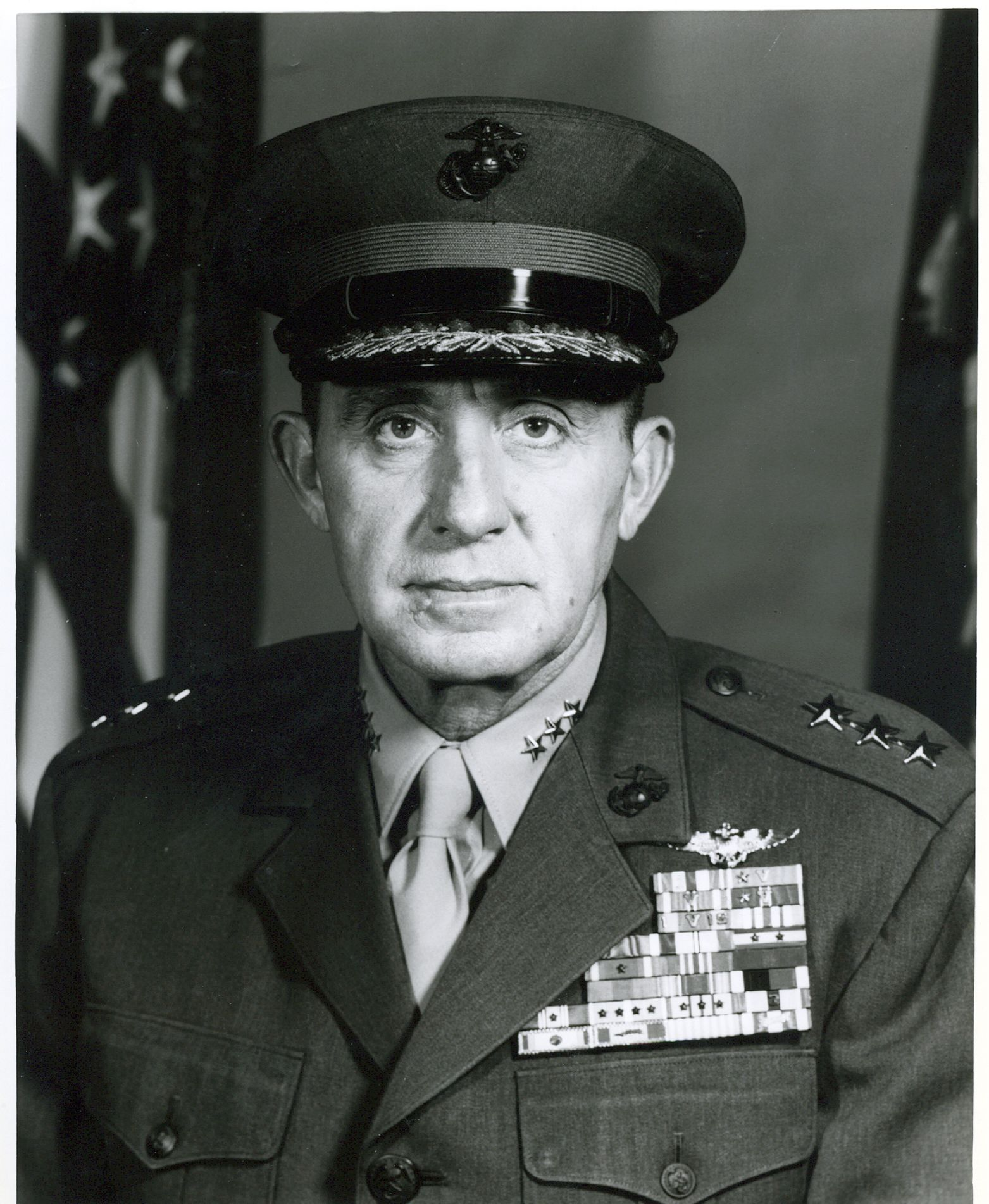
- Born: January 10, 1928; Columbus, Ohio, U.S.
- Died: April 25, 2025 (aged 97)
- Military career
- Allegiance: United States of America
- Branch: United States Marine Corps
- Service years: 1945–1983
- Rank: Lieutenant General
- Commands: 2nd Marine Aircraft Wing; 9th Marine Amphibious Brigade; Marine Aircraft Group 24; Fighter Attack Squadron 115 (VMA-115); Fighter Attack Squadron 513 (VMA-513)
- Conflicts: Korean War: Battle of Inchon; Second Battle of Seoul; Battle of Chosin Reservoir; Vietnam War: Operation Frequent Wind
- Awards: Silver Star; Legion of Merit (2); Distinguished Flying Cross; Bronze Star (2); Air Medal (15); Purple Heart

Richard Edward Carey (January 10, 1928 – April 25, 2025) was a United States Marine Corps Lieutenant General.

== Early life ==
Carey was born in Columbus, Ohio on January 10, 1928.

== Career ==
Carey enlisted in the United States Navy's V-5 aviation cadet program in 1945. With the discontinuance of the V-5 program, he was discharged and enlisted in the Marine Corps and advanced to the rank of sergeant prior to his commissioning as a second lieutenant in 1948. As a rifle platoon commander, he participated in combat in the Korean War in the 1st Marine Division, including the Battle of Inchon and the Battle of Chosin Reservoir. He earned the Silver Star medal while serving as commander of Weapons Company, 3rd Battalion, 1st Marines on March 23, 1951, prior to his medical evacuation to the United States after being wounded in action.

In 1951, Carey served for a year as a company commander at the Marine Corps Recruit Depot Parris Island, South Carolina, and then reported to Naval Air Station Pensacola, Florida, for flight training. After his designation as a Naval Aviator in 1953, Carey held a variety of squadron pilot and staff assignments including separate tours as an intelligence, maintenance, material and logistics officer in both attack and fighter squadrons. He also served as the Assistant G-4 (Logistics) for the 2nd Marine Division and spent one tour as the Aviation Logistics Officer, Office of the Deputy Chief of Staff for Air, Headquarters Marine Corps. He also had assignments in that area at the squadron, group, wing and air station levels. As a colonel, he also served as the Battle Staff Chief in the Office of the Commander-in-Chief, Pacific and later as the G-3 Officer, Fleet Marine Force, Pacific.

His aviation command experience began in 1958 with Headquarters and Maintenance Squadron 32 while a major, stationed at Marine Corps Air Station Beaufort, South Carolina. As a lieutenant colonel at Marine Corps Air Station Cherry Point in 1966, Carey assumed command of Fighter Attack Squadron 513 (VMA-513). Following his assignment to South Vietnam, he commanded Marine Air Base Squadron 13 and later Fighter Attack Squadron 115 (VMA-115) flying the F-4 Phantom in combat operations, while operating from Chu Lai Air Base from October 5, 1967 to January 16, 1968. he then served on the staff of the 1st Marine Aircraft Wing at Da Nang Air Base, South Vietnam. As a colonel in 1971, he commanded Marine Aircraft Group 24, with the 1st Marine Brigade at Marine Corps Air Station Kaneohe Bay Hawaii.

Following his promotion to brigadier general on July 1, 1974, Carey became assistant wing commander, 1st Marine Aircraft Wing, Marine Corps Air Station Iwakuni, Japan. In 1975, he concurrently commanded the 9th Marine Amphibious Brigade where he directed the Marine Corps participation in Operation Frequent Wind, the evacuation of Saigon.

Upon his return to the United States, Carey served as the assistant deputy chief of staff for aviation, Headquarters Marine Corps, where he was promoted to major general on March 2, 1976, and served there until he was assigned duty as commanding general of the 2nd Marine Aircraft Wing at MCAS Cherry Point, North Carolina, in July 1976. In June 1978 he was assigned duty as deputy chief of staff, Commander in Chief, Atlantic, Naval Station Norfolk, Virginia. He was promoted to lieutenant general on October 24, 1980 and assumed duty as commanding general, Marine Corps Development & Education Command, Marine Corps Base Quantico, Virginia. He served in this capacity until his retirement on March 1, 1983.

Carey was a graduate of the Naval War College and held a Bachelor of Science degree in business administration from George Washington University.

== Later life and death ==
Following his retirement from the Marine Corps, Carey served in various governmental roles including as Administrator, Dallas District Courts from 1990 to 1994, in the Ohio Governor's Cabinet from 1983 to 1987 and as Administrator, Columbus International Airport from 1987 to 1988.

Carey died on April 25, 2025, at the age of 97.

== Decorations ==
In addition to the Silver Star, Carey's awards and decorations include: the Legion of Merit with gold star in lieu of a second award; the Distinguished Flying Cross; the Bronze Star with Combat "V" and gold star in lieu of a second award, the Air Medal with Numeral 15; the Joint Service Commendation Medal; the Purple Heart; the Presidential Unit Citation with two bronze stars; the Navy Unit Commendation with one bronze star; and the Meritorious Unit Commendation.
