= Air control =

Air control may refer to:

- Air Control, a 2014 video game
- Air traffic control, a service for directing aircraft traffic, mainly civilian
- Air supremacy, the military concept of controlling an area through airpower
- Airborne early warning and control, a system for directing military aircraft from the air
- Forward air control, a system for directing military aircraft on the battlefield
- Ground-controlled interception, a system for directing military aircraft from a central ground base
