= Edward S. Fris =

United States Marine Corps general

Edward Steve Fris
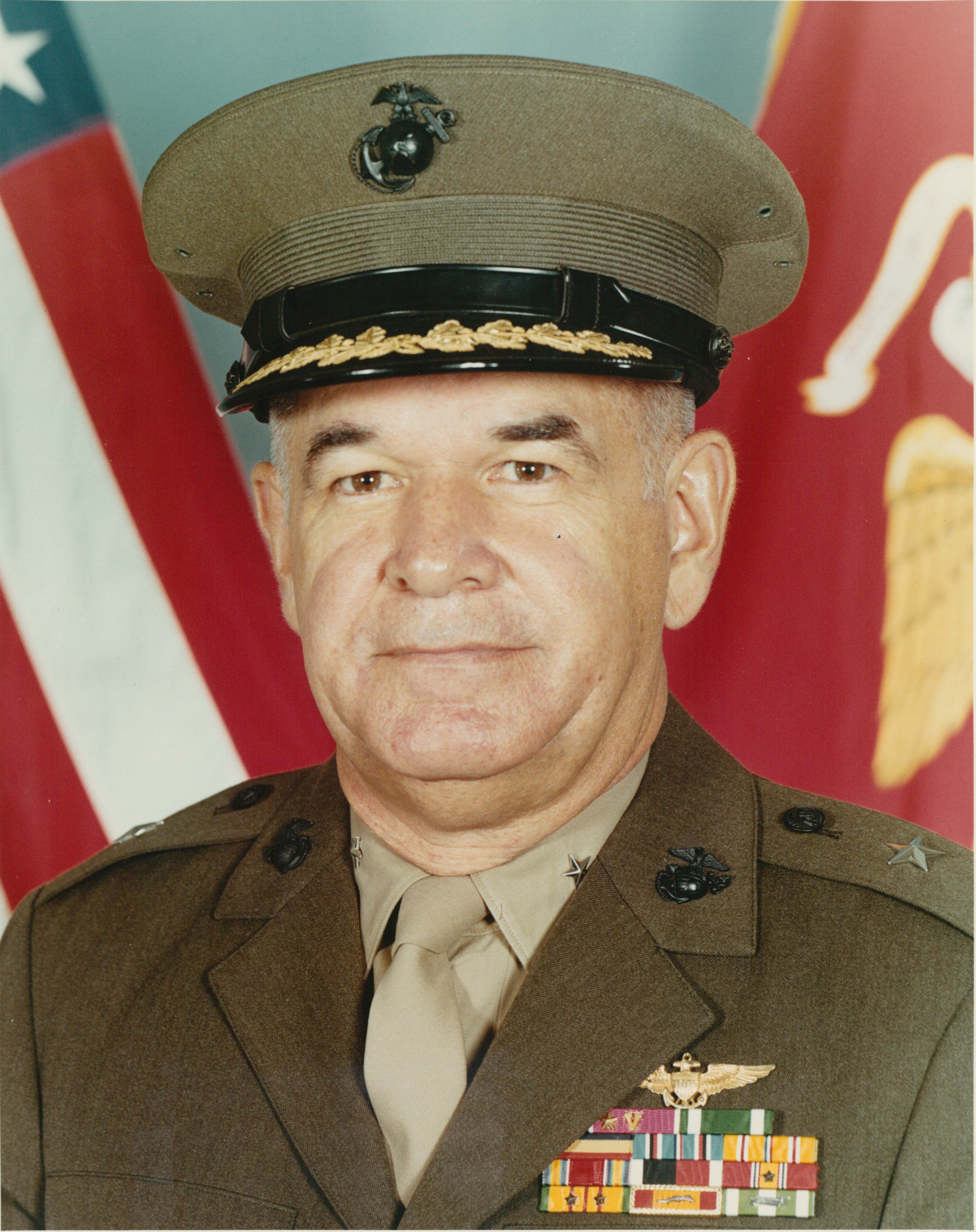
- BGen Edward S. Fris - November 1971
- Born: September 1, 1921; Orient, Illinois, U.S.
- Died: May 17, 2010 (aged 88); Falls Church, Virginia, U.S.
- Burial place: Quantico National Cemetery
- Military career
- Allegiance: United States of America
- Branch: United States Marine Corps
- Service years: 1943–1975
- Rank: Lieutenant general
- Commands: Marine Corps Development and Education Command; Director of Aviation, USMC; Marine Air Control Group 18; Marine Air Control Squadron 3
- Conflicts: World War II; Vietnam War
- Awards: Navy Distinguished Service Medal; Legion of Merit

Edward Steve Fris (1 September 1921 – 17 May 2010) was a lieutenant general in the United States Marine Corps. He served as the Director of Aviation, Headquarters Marine Corps and is considered a pioneer in the development of today's Marine Air Command and Control System (MACCS).

He was commissioned during World War II and originally trained as a radar officer. Following the war, he transitioned to become a naval aviator. His radar and electrical engineering background led to his near decade long involvement with the development of the Marine Tactical Data System (MTDS). He served as the commanding officer (CO) of Marine Air Control Squadron 3 (MACS-3) for more than four years from 1961-1965 as MTDS went through operational test and evaluation.

Later assignments included a tour in Vietnam as the CO of Marine Air Control Group 18 (MACG-18), time as Commanding General Marine Corps Air Bases Western Area and two years as the Director of Marine Corps Aviation. His final assignment before retirement was as the Commanding General of the Marine Corps Development and Education Command. The Marine Corps Aviation Association award given annually to the top Marine Corps Aviation Command and Control Unit is named in his honor.

== Early years ==
Born September 1, 1921, in Orient, Illinois, Fris attended Frankfort Community High School, West Frankfort, Illinois, graduating in 1939. He was the president of his senior class at the Missouri School of Mines and graduated with a bachelor's degree in electrical engineering in February 1943. He was commissioned a second lieutenant in the United States Marine Corps Reserve on 2 February 1943.

== World War II and transition to Naval Aviator ==
Fris completed the Officer Candidates School in June 1943. Afterwards he attended the Naval Trainings for radar at Harvard University and the Massachusetts Institute of Technology. He also completed the Radar Maintenance Course at Camp Murphy in Orlando, Florida.

During World War II, Fris served at Marine Corps Air Station Cherry Point, North Carolina, as a radar officer with the 9th Marine Aircraft Wing (9th MAW) and later with Aircraft, Fleet Marine Force Pacific in Hawaii. Upon his return to the United States in January 1946, he entered flight training at Naval Air Station Corpus Christi, Texas. He received his wings and was designated a Naval Aviator upon completion of flight training at Naval Air Station Pensacola, Florida, on June 27, 1947. After completing advanced training at the Naval Air Station Jacksonville, he was assigned to the Marine Corps Air Station El Toro, California for duty as a flight officer with VMF-312 with a follow on tour as the Executive Officer of the station's Headquarters Squadron. He was promoted to captain in August 1947.

== 1950s ==
He attended the Amphibious Warfare School Junior Course at Marine Corps Base Quantico, Virginia graduating in December 1950. He remained at Quantico for a few more months before attending the United States Naval Postgraduate Schools at Annapolis, Maryland and Monterey in California. He graduated from those schools in November 1951 and June 1954, respectively. From June through October 1954 he refreshed his pilot qualifications with VMFT-10 prior to his next assignment as executive officer of VMF-115 from December 1954 until December 1955. He next served as the Electronics Officer for the 2nd Marine Aircraft Wing beginning in January 1956. In June 1957, Fris reported to Headquarters Marine Corps, Washington, D.C., for duty as Head, Aviation Electronics Logistics Section, Division of Aviation, for three years. During his time at HQMC Aviation, then Major Fris was responsible for writing the Marine Corps' requirements for their new aviation command and control Program of Record - Marine Tactical Data System (MTDS).

== MTDS development and Vietnam ==
Promoted to lieutenant colonel in January 1959, Fris was made the Marine Corps Liaison Officer with Litton Industries in Los Angeles, California, in July. He oversaw the design and development of the MTDS program. At this time, MTDS was the largest research and development project in the Marine Corps. From September 1961 until February 1965, he served as the Commanding Officer of Marine Air Control Squadron 3 (MACS-3) at Marine Corps Air Facility Santa Ana, California. During this time, MACS-3 was the designated operational test and evaluation squadron for MTDS seeing it through numerous financial and developmental issues until it was officially fielded in 1966.

He returned to Washington, D.C., in April 1965, and served as Head, Marine Corps Amphibious Electronics Branch, Electronics Division, Bureau of Ships. Fris was reassigned to Headquarters Marine Corps in August 1966, as Head, Aviation Command Control and Communications Branch, Office of the Deputy Chief of Staff (Air). He was the first officer to serve in this newly formed billet which today is known as Branch Head, Aviation Expeditionary Enablers (APX-1). Following this assignment he took command of Marine Air Control Group 18 (MACG-18), in July 1968 and served a year in Danang, South Vietnam.

== Promotion and Director of Aviation ==
Upon his return to the United States, Fris was promoted to brigadier general on August 22, 1969, and designated as Inspector General of the Marine Corp until July 1970, when he assumed duty as Assistant Deputy Chief of Staff (Programs). Detached from Headquarters Marine Corps in October 1971, he again reported to MCAS El Toro, where he commanded the Air Station and Marine Corps Air Bases Western Area. In September 1972 Fris returned to Headquarters Marine Corps to serve as Deputy Chief of Staff for Aviation. Following his advancement to lieutenant general on August 27, 1974, he became commanding general, Marine Corps Development and Education Command (MCDEC), MCB Quantico, Virginia, remaining in that billet until his retirement.

== Retirement, death and legacy ==
Fris retired from active duty on 1 September 1975. He was married to the former Minerva E. Fellows of East Orange, New Jersey. He had two daughters, two step-daughters and a son, Captain Steve A. Fris, who preceded him in death. Fris died on 17 May 2010 and is buried in Quantico National Cemetery with his wife and son.

The Marine Corps Aviation Association's annual award for the Marine Aviation Command and Control Unit of the year is named after him.

== Medals and decorations ==
Here is the ribbon bar of Lieutenant General Edward S. Fris:

Military offices
Preceded by Homer S. Hill	Director of Aviation, Headquarters Marine Corps; 25 August 1972 - 27 August 1974	Succeeded by Philip D. Shutler
