= Marine Air Control Squadron 3 =

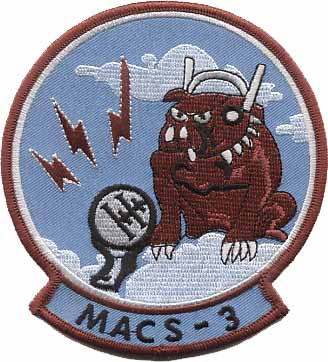
- MACS-3 Insignia
- Active: 1 May 1944 - 1 Jul 1970
- Country: United States of America
- Branch: United States Marine Corps
- Type: Aviation Command & Control
- Role: Operational Test & Evaluation; Aerial surveillance ground-controlled interception
- Nickname(s): "Doodlebug"
- Engagements: Korean War

Commanders
- Notable commanders: Edward S. Fris

Marine Air Control Squadron 3 (MACS-3) was a former United States Marine Corps aviation command and control squadron. During its later years it also served as an operational test and evaluation squadron. Originally formed in World War II as Air Warning Squadron 12 (AWS-12), its original mission was to provide aerial surveillance and ground-controlled interception (GCI) for Marine Corps forces during amphibious operations. The squadron did not participate in combat operations during WWII however it did deploy and operate during the Korean War. In 1961, MACS-3 was transferred from the Fleet Marine Force to the administrative control of Air, Fleet Marine Forces Pacific in order to serve as the operational test and evaluation squadron for what was at the time, the largest research and development project in the Marine Corps - Marine Tactical Data System (MTDS). After MTDS testing was complete the Marine Corps recognized that it was not properly staffed to develop, test, and acquire new digital equipment. On 1 July 1970, MACS-3 was decommissioned and its structure and equipment were utilized to form Marine Corps Tactical Systems Support Activity (MCTSSA) at Marine Corps Base Camp Pendleton, California. Of note, MCTSSA does not carry MACS-3's lineage and honors.

== History ==
=== World War II ===
Air Warning Squadron 12 (AWS-12) was commissioned on 1 May 1944 at Marine Corps Air Station Cherry Point, North Carolina. At the end of May, the squadron moved to Marine Corps Auxiliary Airfield Oak Grove, NC except for a small detachment that was sent to Marine Corps Auxiliary Airfield Atlantic, NC. During this time, they trained in day and night radar operations and fighter control. Equipment utilized included the SCR-270, SCR-527 and the SCR-602.

Beginning on 15 August 1944, the squadron began travel from MCAS Cherry Point to Marine Corps Air Station Miramar, California arriving on 23 August. After acquiring gear on the west coast, they transitioned to Marine Corps Air Station Santa Barbara, CA. At MCAS Santa Barbara squadron detachments were spread out from Point Dume to Point Conception and were responsible for providing early warning, ground controlled intercept, and assisted with air-sea rescue. In February 1945 the squadron was alerted for overseas duty and began preparations. They arrived at Marine Corps Air Station Ewa, Hawaii on 22 June. Three days later 8 officers and 88 enlisted Marines from AWS-12 were sent temporary additional duty to Kwajalein Atoll. The squadron conducted training for the next couple of months until departing Pearl Harbor on 13 September. They arrived in Sasebo Harbor, Japan on 8 October reporting to Marine Aircraft Group 22 but never disembarked. They left Sasebo on 25 November arriving back at Pearl Harbor on 9 December. At sea again from 11 to 21 December arriving at San Francisco. A week later they arrived at San Pedro, Los Angeles, and made their way back to MCAS Miramar.

AWS-12 was re-designated as Marine Ground Control Intercept Squadron 3 on 1 August 1946 as part of a larger reorganization within Marine Aviation after the war. In September 1947, the squadron moved further north to Marine Corps Air Station El Toro in Orange County, California.

=== Korean War & the 1950s ===
In early 1951, Marine Tactical Air Control Squadron 2 and Marine Ground Control Intercept Squadron 1 operating in the vicinity of Pusan, were at maximum capacity identifying and controlling aircraft in their assigned sectors. Poor Identification friend or foe (IFF) equipment and procedures were causing a waste of assets having to visually identify suspect aircraft. To deal with these issues, the 1st Marine Air Wing Commanding General, Major General Field Harris, requested an additional MGCIS be deployed to Korea. On 1–2 March they loaded the squadron's equipment on board the SS Charles E. Dant at Port of Long Beach, California. On 5 March, squadron personnel boarded the USS General W. F. Hase (AP-146) at San Francisco, California and sailed west. On 20 March they arrived off Yokohama, Japan disembarking two days later at Kobe where they set up at Itami Air Base. The squadron arrived in Korea on 14 April 1951 and set up at Tactical Air Direction Center at Homigot to the east of Pohang. From this position, they provided 360-degree air surveillance and fighter direction, navigational assistance for aircraft headed to K-3 Airfield, coordination with Ground-controlled approach at Pohang, and navigational assistance for A-26 Bombers from the 452d Bombardment Wing flying out of Pusan East (K-9) Air Base. Radars utilized by MGCIS-3 during this time included the AN/TPS-1B, AN/MPS-4, and the AN/CPS-5. On 29 June 1951, the squadron also places an early warning radar site on Jeju Island.

MACS-3 remained in Korea until June 1956 when it moved to Japan along with the remainder of 1st Marine Aircraft Wing units still on the peninsula. The squadron departed MCAS Iwakuni in August 1959 and re-established operations that same month at Marine Corps Air Station Santa Ana, CA. They fell in on the facilities and equipment that had been used by Marine Air Control Squadron 4 before their deployment to the Far East. From 1959 until early in 1961, MACS-3 participated in numerous air defense exercises throughout the Southwestern United States training with numerous units from the 3d Marine Aircraft Wing and Terrier and HAWK Missile units from Marine Corps Base Twentynine Palms, CA.

=== MTDS Testing and decommissioning ===
In early 1961, MACS-3 at Marine Corps Air Station Santa Ana, California was administratively detached from the I Marine Amphibious Force and moved under Air, Fleet Marine Forces Pacific for purposes of testing MTDS equipment and operational concepts. On 5 March 1962, Sub-Unit 1 under MACS-3 was formed at Marine Corps Base Twentynine Palms, CA for the purposes of testing MTDS with HAWK Missile units. In early July 1962, Sub-Unit 1 took delivery of the second Tactical Air Operations Center delivered in order to begin testing. MACS-3 graduated its first class of MTDS operators and maintainers on 8 October 1963. The initial course was twenty weeks long for maintainers and six weeks long for operators. Classroom instructions were provided by the Marines of MACS-3, field representatives from Litton Industries, and civilians from the US Navy's Naval Aviation Engineering Service Unit.

In late 1964, MACS-3 was also tasked with testing MTDS interoperability with the Navy's new Airborne Tactical Data System that was installed aboard the first E-2A Hawkeye early warning aircraft.

In March 1966, MACS-3 accepted the first production model of MTDS's new Tactical Air Operations Central. This included a fully automated TAOC (designated the AN/TYQ-2), as well as a Tactical Data Communications Central (TDCC - designated the AN/TYQ-3). The TDCC utilized a UNIVAC CP-808 computer to exchange air command and control data. The squadron put the new equipment through 30 weeks of rigorous operational test and evaluation before it fielding it to the FMF.

By 1968, the Marine Corps realized that MACS-3 was not organized or staffed to meet the growing demands to acquire and support new automated digital systems. Litton Industries initiated a study to explore the requirements to support new and emerging tactical data systems. The study recommended the creation of a Tactical Data Systems Support Center at Marine Corps Base Camp Pendleton, California. In May 1970, the Marine Corps Development and Education Command (MCDEC) plan were approved wherein the equipment and facilities of MACS-3 would serve as the foundation of this new organization. In June 1970, a Marine Corps Bulletin was published transferring MACS-3's equipment and facilities over to the new organization known as "Marine Corps Tactical Systems Support Activity" (MCTSSA) MACS-3 was formally decommissioned on 1 July 1970. Of note, the lineage and honors of MACS-3 did not transfer to MCTSSA.

== Unit awards ==
A unit citation or commendation is an award bestowed upon an organization for the action cited. Members of the unit who participated in said actions are allowed to wear on their uniforms the awarded unit citation. MACS-3 has been presented with the following awards:

Streamer	Award	Year(s)	Additional Info
	Presidential Unit Citation Streamer with two Bronze Stars	1951	Korea
	Navy Unit Commendation Streamer	1952-1953	Korea
	American Campaign Streamer	1944-1946	World War II
	National Defense Service Streamer with one Bronze Star	1950–1954, 1961–1970	Korean War, Vietnam War
	Korean Service Streamer with one Silver Star and one Bronze Stars	1951-1953	

== See also ==
- Aviation combat element
- United States Marine Corps Aviation
- List of United States Marine Corps aviation support squadrons
