= Marine Air Control Squadron 5 =

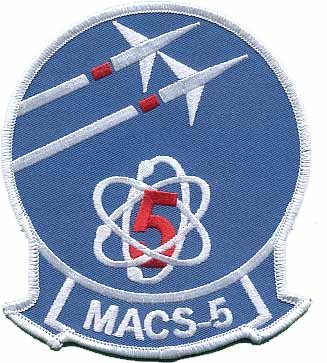
- MACS-5 Insignia
- Active: 1 June 1944 – 31 Jan 1956; 1 Oct 1957 – 11 June 1993
- Country: United States of America
- Branch: United States Marine Corps
- Type: Aviation Command & Control
- Role: Aerial surveillance & Air traffic control

Marine Air Control Squadron 5 (MACS-5) was a United States Marine Corps aviation command and control squadron. The squadron provided aerial surveillance and early warning while it was active from 1944 through 1993. They were last based at Marine Corps Air Station Beaufort, South Carolina and fell under the command of Marine Air Control Group 28 (MACG-28) and the 2nd Marine Aircraft Wing (2nd MAW).

== History ==
=== World War II ===
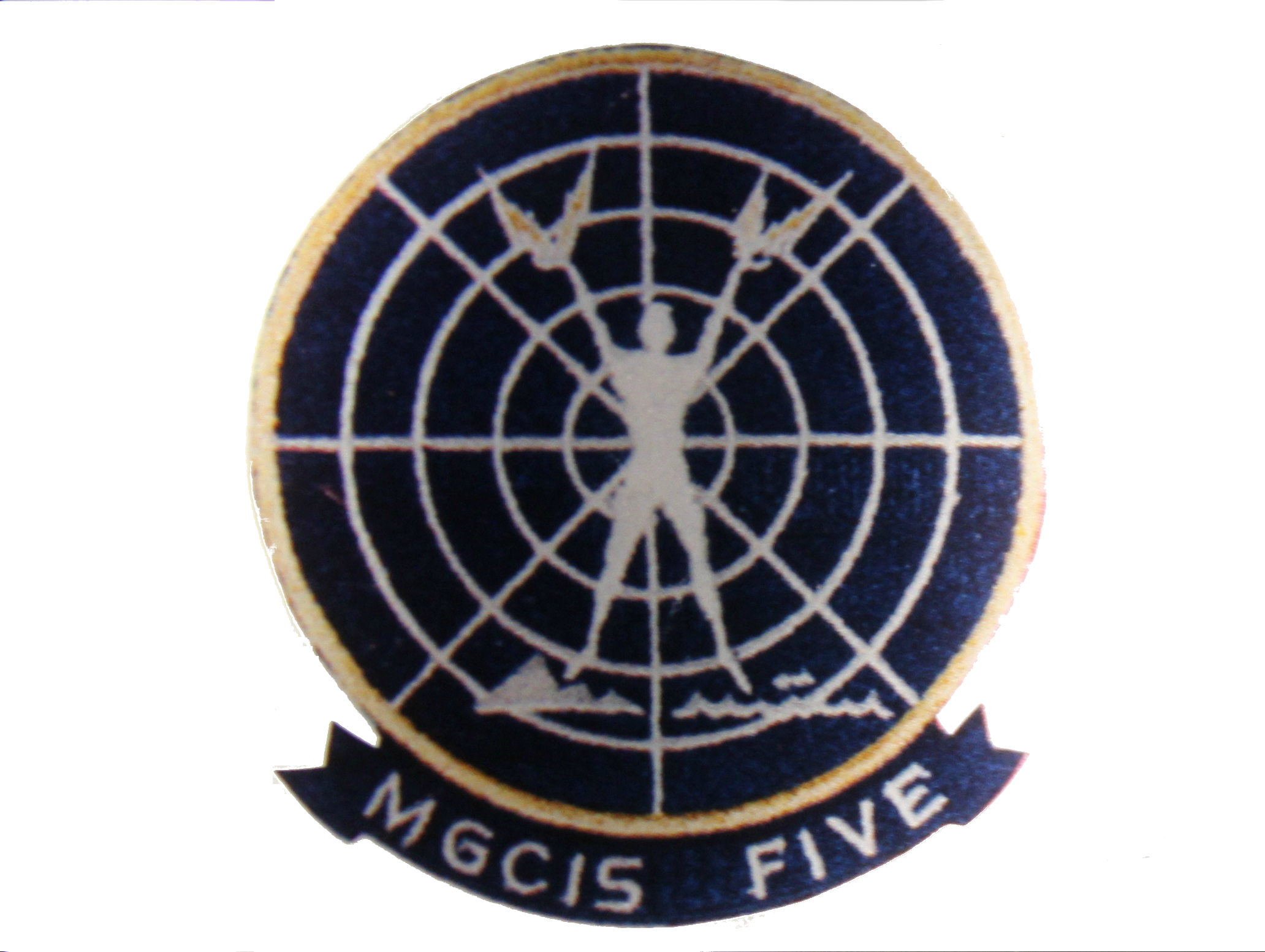
Squadron insignia for Marine Ground Control Intercept Squadron 5 (MGCIS-5)

Air Warning Squadron 16 was commissioned on 1 June 1944, at Marine Corps Air Station Cherry Point, North Carolina. AWS-16 moved to Marine Corps Auxiliary Airfield Atlantic in July 1944 for additional training. It returned to MCAS Cherry Point in September 1944. On 1 August 1946, the squadron was re-designated as Marine Ground Control Intercept Squadron 5 (MGCIS-5).

=== 1950s and 1960s ===
Throughout the postwar period and the Korean War the squadron remained at MCAS Cherry Point, except for recurrent exercises along the east coast of the United States. The squadron would move from MCAS Cherry Point to Marine Corps Auxiliary Landing Field Edenton, North Carolina on 16 September 1953. On 15 February 1954 the unit received its final designation as Marine Air Control Squadron 5 (MACS-5). Its mission was defined as follows: "To install, maintain, and operate ground facilities for the detection and interception of hostile aircraft and missiles and for the navigational direction of friendly aircraft in the accomplishment of support missions". Just short of two years later the squadron would be decommissioned on 31 January 1956.

MACS-5 was reactivated on 1 October 1957, at MCAS Beaufort, South Carolina as part of Marine Aircraft Group 32 (MAG-32). They had responsibility for controlling the more complex jet aircraft that were now being used in the post-Korean War era. In 1963, the squadron would deploy to Naval Air Station Atsugi, Japan for a year. While deployed they also supported exercises in Taiwan and South Korea. They returned to a different home station after the deployment, this time settling at Marine Corps Air Station New River, North Carolina. During this time the unit was using the AN/TPS-34 and AN/TPS-22 long range search radars in concert with the AN/UPS-1 short range search radar and the AN/TPS-37 height finder.

=== 1970s and 1980s ===
On 21 June 1971, MACS-5 was decommissioned at MCAS New River only to be reactivated on 1 July 1971, at MCAS Beaufort, South Carolina. The squadron deployed to various nations in and around Europe and the Mediterranean Sea supporting numerous North Atlantic Treaty Organization (NATO) exercises during the 1970s and 1980s.

=== 1990s and decommissioning ===
On 11 June 1993, Marine Air Control Squadron 2 (MACS-2) was decommissioned at Marine Corps Base Hawaii and MACS-5 at the Marine Corps Air Station Beaufort, South Carolina was renamed MACS-2. This deactivation was due to a reduction in Marine air control squadrons from six active and two reserve squadrons to three active and one reserve squadron as part of the post-cold war drawdown of forces. The new MACS-2 maintained MACS-2's lineage and honors and did not retain those of MACS-5.

== Unit awards ==
A unit citation or commendation is an award bestowed upon an organization for the action cited. Members of the unit who participated in said actions are allowed to wear on their uniforms the awarded unit citation. MACS-6 has been presented with the following awards:

Streamer	Award	Year(s)	Additional Info
	Meritorious Unit Commendation Streamer	1980–1981, 1985–1986	
	American Campaign Service Streamer with one Bronze Star	1942–1945	World War II
	World War II Victory Streamer	1941–1945	Pacific War
	National Defense Service Streamer with two Bronze Stars	1950–1954, 1961–1974, 1990–1995	Korean War, Vietnam War, Gulf War

== Notable former members ==
- Gordon Peterson – Washington, D.C.–based television news anchor.

== See also ==
- United States Marine Corps Aviation
- Aviation combat element
- List of United States Marine Corps aviation support squadrons
