= Marine Air Control Squadron 7 =

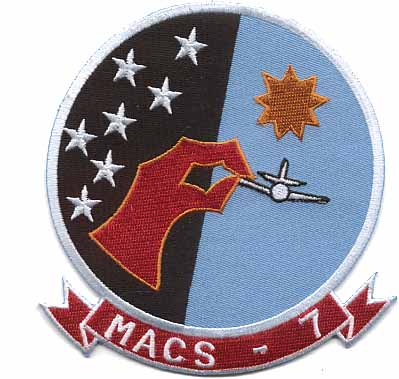
- MACS-7 Insignia
- Active: 1 Apr 1944 – Sept 1998
- Country: United States of America
- Branch: United States Marine Corps
- Type: Aviation Command & Control
- Role: Aerial surveillance & Air traffic control
- Nicknames: "The Guiding Hand"; Prosecute (callsign); Moonman (Vietnam)
- Engagements: World War II: Battle of Okinawa; Vietnam War Gulf War

Marine Air Control Squadron 7 (MACS-7) was a United States Marine Corps aviation command and control squadron. The squadron provided aerial surveillance and ground-controlled interception and saw action most notably during the Battle of Okinawa in World War II and the Vietnam War. They were last based at Marine Corps Air Station Yuma and fell under the command of Marine Air Control Group 38 (MACG-38) and the 3rd Marine Aircraft Wing (3rd MAW).

== History ==
=== World War II ===
Air Warning Squadron 7 was commissioned 1 February 1944. as part of a larger program to provide radar early warning and fighter control for Marine units during amphibious operations. It was one of several such squadrons attached to Marine Air Warning Group 1 at Marine Corps Air Station Cherry Point, North Carolina. For its first two months the squadron remained in the vicinity of MCAS Cherry Point learning to control both day and night aircraft. On 27 March 1944 they embarked for the west coast arriving on 1 April 1944. The squadron was subsequently stationed at Naval Auxiliary Air Station Brown Field in Chula Vista, California where they underwent a long period of intensive training in which they controlled fighters, torpedo bombers and bombers during simulated combat missions. Combat conditioning and the firing of various infantry weapons was also a part of the regular training program.

On 1 January 1945 the squadron began to load their gear on ships and set sail 3 January 1945. They arrived at Marine Corps Air Station Ewa, Hawaii on 10 January 1945 and proceeded to the nearby island of Kauai for further training. At this time, Early Warning Teams of sixteen men and two officers were each detached from the squadron for temporary duty with the 1st and 6th Marine Division, the III Amphibious Corps and the Tenth United States Army

On 19 February 1945 the squadron boarded amphibious ships and spent the remainder of the month and all of March transiting to Okinawa. AWS-7 debarked at Okinawa on 6 April 1945 and immediately set-up operating units in the vicinity of Yontan Airfield. Eight days later the squadron moved to Hedo Point at the very northern tip of Okinawa where there remained a fair bit of enemy activity.

During May 1945 the squadron controlled over 1800 aircraft without the loss of any pilots, assisted in the rescue of eight pilots who bailed out over water, controlled interceptions resulting in the destruction of 45 enemy planes, and with its direction finding station brought eighteen lost planes home. In June, the squadron controlled 503 division of combat air patrol (CAP) aircraft as well as 40 divisions of close air support and strike missions, 94 barrier CAP divisions and 24 air-sea rescue escort divisions. On 19 June, the squadron was joined by a platoon from a United States Army Air Warning Battalion.

In July, AWS-7 handled 312 CAP division, 105 special strike mission divisions and 14 air-sea rescue escort divisions. Two successful night interceptions were directed during the month to bring the squadron's total at the end of July to 63-day and 9 night kills.

The squadron's final numbers during the Battle of Okinawa were 76 enemy planes splashed, 33 air-sea rescues and 315 lost planes honed homed.

After the surrender of Japan in August 1945, AWS-7 remained on Okinawa for a few months until it departed for China in October 1945. They squadron established itself at Nanyuan Airfield near Beiping (now Beijing). On 1 August 1946, the squadron was re-designated as Marine Ground Control Intercept Squadron 7 (MGCIS-7). They remained in China controlling aircraft during the American occupation until 7 January 1949. After leaving China, the squadron transferred to Marine Corps Air Station Edenton, North Carolina and was assigned to Marine Aircraft Group 15 (MAG-15).

=== Vietnam War ===
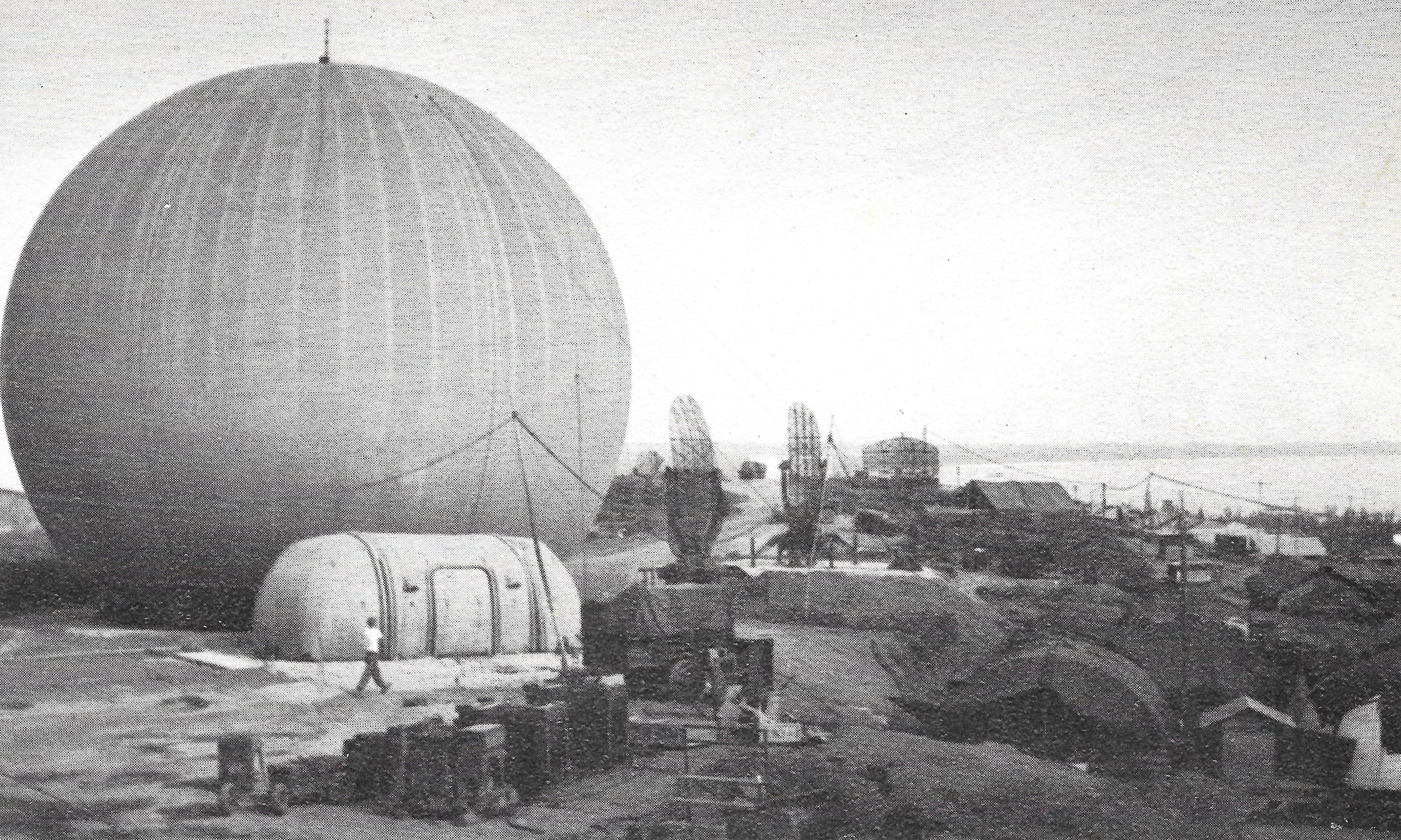
MACS-7 radar site at Chu Lai in 1965. To the right of the large radome are two AN/TPS-37 Height finder radars and the larger radar in the distance is an AN/MPS-11A.

On April 17, 1965 MACS-7 was moved from MCAS Cherry Point, NC to Marine Corps Air Station Iwakuni, Japan. In September 1965 the squadron redeployed to Chu Lai in the Republic of Vietnam. MACS-7 assumed responsibility for radar control over I Corps on September 15, 1965. The squadron remained in Vietnam providing early warning and air surveillance until July 1967 when it was replaced by MACS-4 operating the new Marine Tactical Data System. MACS-7 transferred to Marine Corps Base Camp Pendleton, California and was reassigned to Marine Air Control Group 38.

== Unit awards ==
A unit citation or commendation is an award bestowed upon an organization for the action cited. Members of the unit who participated in said actions are allowed to wear on their uniforms the awarded unit citation. MACS-7 has been presented with the following awards:

Streamer	Award	Year(s)	Additional Info
	Presidential Unit Citation Streamer with one Silver and three Bronze Stars	1945, 1965–1967	Okinawa, Vietnam,
	Navy Unit Commendation Streamer	1990–1991	Southwest Asia
	Meritorious Unit Commendation Streamer	1985-1987, 1988-1989	
	Asiatic-Pacific Campaign Streamer with one Bronze Star		Okinawa
	World War II Victory Streamer	1941–1945	Pacific War
	Navy Occupation Service Streamer with "ASIA"		
	China Service Streamer with one Bronze Star	October 1946 – Jan 1947	North China
	National Defense Service Streamer with two Bronze Stars	1950–1954, 1961–1974, 1990–1995	Korean War, Vietnam War, Gulf War
	Vietnam Service Streamer with four Bronze Stars		
	Vietnam Gallantry Cross with Palm Streamer		

== See also ==
- Aviation combat element
- United States Marine Corps Aviation
- List of decommissioned United States Marine Corps aircraft squadrons
- List of United States Marine Corps aviation support squadrons
