= Monkey Mountain Facility =

U.S. Air Force and Marine base in Vietnam

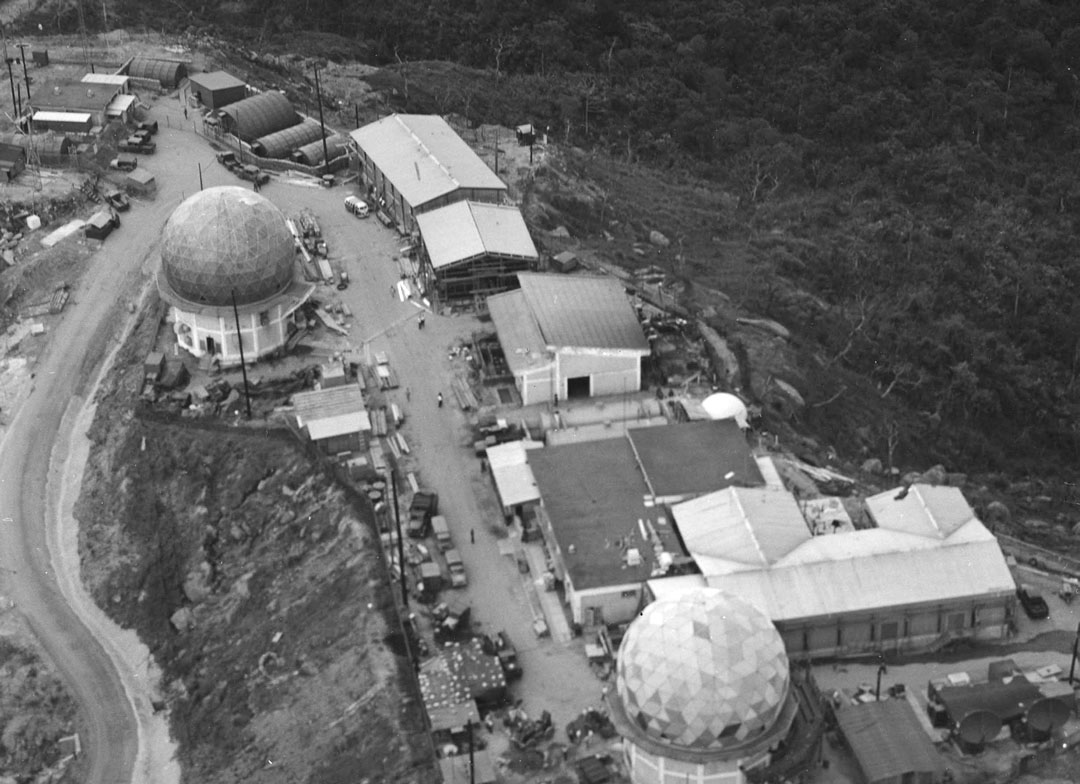
- Monkey Mountain SIGINT facility

Site information
- Type: Air Force/Marines

Location
- Coordinates: 16.119°N 108.275°E

Site history
- Built: 1962
- In use: 1962-72
- Battles/wars: Vietnam War

Garrison information
- Occupants: Detachment 2, 6925th Security Group; 620th Tactical Control Squadron; 1st LAAM Battalion; Marine Air Control Squadron 4 6924th Security Squadron.

Monkey Mountain Facility (also known as Monkey Mountain SIGINT, Hill 621 or Panama) was a U.S. Air Force (USAF) and Marine base located on Sơn Trà Mountain east of Da Nang.

== History ==
The base was located on the peak of Sơn Trà Mountain, overlooking Danang Harbour and China Beach. In 1962, the U.S. Navy Officer in Charge of Construction directed the American construction contractor RMK-BRJ to build a new Air Control Radar Station atop the north peak of the mountain, including 12 buildings at the bottom of the mountain and 11 buildings atop the mountain, as well as the road up the mountain to the north peak.

The USAF Detachment 2, 6925th Security Group established a signals intelligence (SIGINT) base on the mountain in 1962 to intercept North Vietnamese HF and VHF communications.

The USAF 620th Tactical Control Squadron established a Control and Reporting Center (CRC) Call Sign Panama on the mountain in 1964 to control fighters operating in I Corps. Most of the fighters came from Da Nang Air Base or Phu Cat Air Base.

On 14 February 1965 the Marine 1st LAAM Battalion established its anti-aircraft operations center colocated with the USAF CRP. The MIM-23 Hawk missiles of A Battery, 1st LAAM Battalion were also deployed on the mountain approximately 5 km south of the CRP. The USAF retained overall control of air defense around Danang. The CRC controlled when and if the Marine Hawk missiles could be fired.

In May 1965, Navy Seabees from Naval Mobile Construction Battalion Three (NMCB 3) started to construct a road from the north peak to the south peak of Monkey Mountain, and then construct a HAWK missile base atop the peak. The south peak originally was the size of a desk, but the top was removed through explosives to provide 15 acres (6.1 ha) to 20 acres (8.1 ha) of space for the missile battery, shops and living spaces. NMCB-3 was relieved mid-way through construction by NMCB-9.

In August 1965 the 9th Marines assumed responsibility for the defense of the Monkey Mountain area.

On 26 October 1965 two F-4B Phantoms of VMFA-115 returning to Danang Air Base from a mission crashed into the side of Monkey Mountain, killing all four crewmembers.

In late 1966 the USAF established a new tactical air control - north center (TACC-NS) at the base, which controlled all air operations over North Vietnam.

In July 1967 Marine Air Control Squadron 4 (MACS-4) established a new Marine Tactical Data System (MTDS) and Tactical Air Operations Center (TAOC), allowing for the control of up to 200 aircraft at once and a direct link to the Seventh Fleet's Naval Tactical Data System.

On 24 March 1968 an F-8 Crusader Bu 150306 from VF-53 crashed into the side of Monkey Mountain. The pilot ejected successfully. The rear fuselage of the jet which embedded in the mountain became a popular photo opportunity for military personnel.

In July 1969 the 1st LAAM Battalion was withdrawn from Vietnam.

In February 1971 MACS-4 was withdrawn from Vietnam. 20 Marines from the Squadron remained at Monkey Mountain to man the Marine Tactical Data Communications Center (TDCC), an automated facility which linked the Air Force and Navy aircraft tracking systems and antiair warfare direction.

In March 1971 the USAF SIGINT facility was closed and its operations were moved to Thailand.

== Current use ==
The base has largely reverted to jungle, although a modern radio tower has been built at the site.
