= Earl E. Anderson =

United States Marine Corps general (1919–2015)

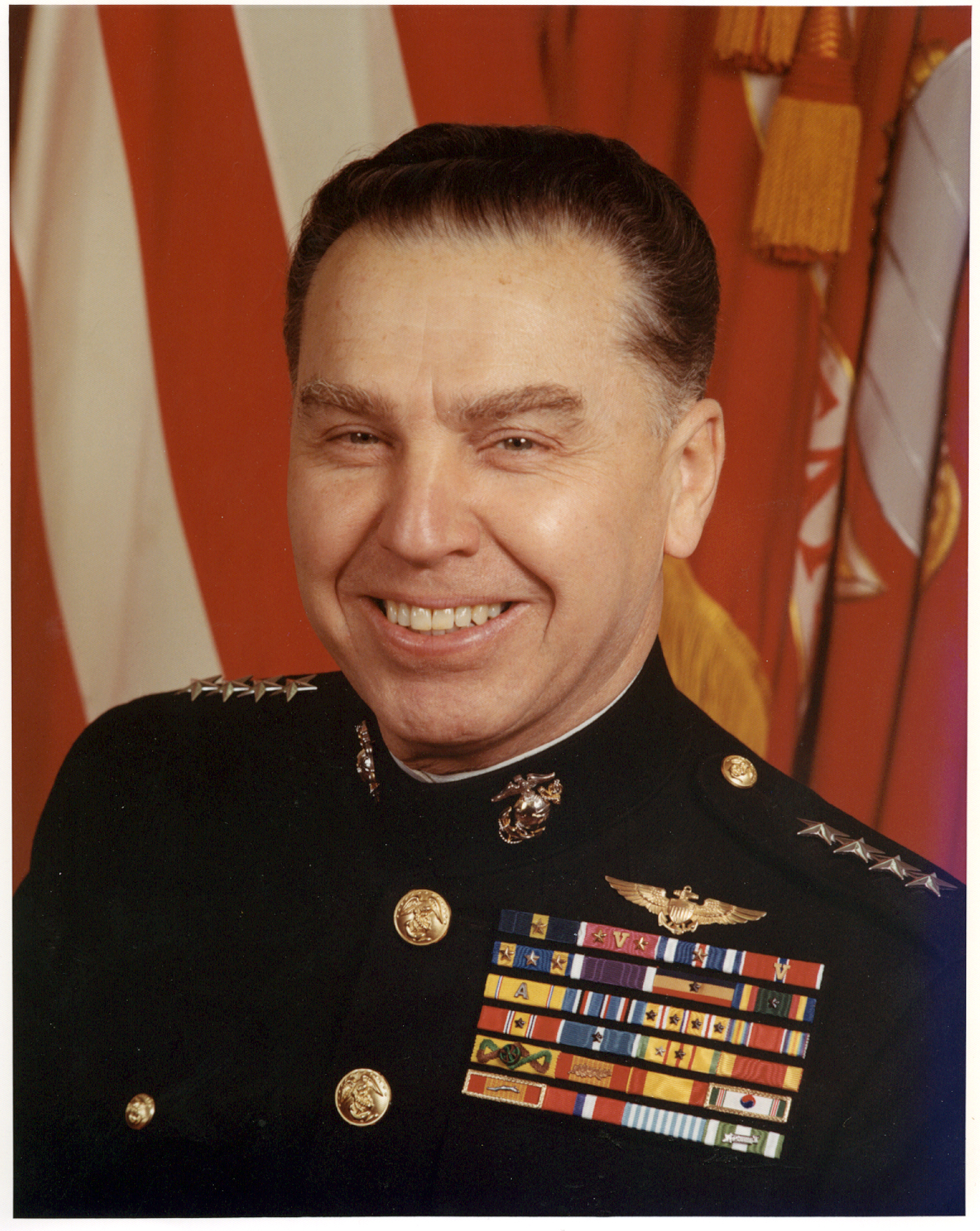
- General Earl E. Anderson, USMC
- Born: Earl Edward Anderson; June 24, 1919; Morgantown, West Virginia, U.S.
- Died: November 12, 2015 (aged 96); Bethesda, Maryland, U.S.
- Burial place: Arlington National Cemetery
- Military career
- Allegiance: United States of America
- Branch: United States Marine Corps
- Service years: 1940–1975
- Rank: General
- Commands: VMO-6; Marine Aircraft Group 26; Marine Aircraft Group 36; Assistant Commandant, USMC (1972–1975)
- Conflicts: World War II; Korean War; Vietnam War
- Awards: 49 (26 distinct)
- Other work: 1970 U.S. Olympic Committee, board of directors

Earl Edward Anderson (June 24, 1919 – November 12, 2015) was a U.S. Marine four-star general. He was the youngest active duty Marine ever promoted to the rank of general and the first active duty Marine Naval Aviator to be promoted to a 4-star rank. He became Assistant Commandant of the Marine Corps on April 1, 1972. He was promoted to general on March 31, 1972. General Keith B. McCutcheon had been promoted to four-star rank the day of his retirement for medical reasons on July 1, 1971. During his 35-year Marine career, he served in combat actions in World War II, the Korean War, and the Vietnam War.

== Training and teaching ==
Anderson entered West Virginia University, where he was a member of Tau Kappa Epsilon fraternity, and graduated in 1940 after earning a Bachelor of Science degree. In June 1940 he was commissioned a Marine second lieutenant and reported to The Basic School (TBS) in Philadelphia for officer training. Upon graduation from TBS in February 1941, he was ordered to Sea School, Marine Barracks, Portsmouth, Virginia, where he served as an instructor. He remained in that assignment until May, when he received assignment to the USS Yorktown (CV-5), which was operating with the neutrality patrol in the North Atlantic.

== World War II ==
With the outbreak of World War II in the Pacific, Anderson and the Yorktown were transferred there, where they participated in the Gilbert and Marshall Islands campaign, the Salamaua-Lae campaign, and the Battles of the Coral Sea and Midway. He was serving on the Yorktown when it was sunk during the Battle of Midway. During this period of time, he was promoted to first lieutenant in December 1941 and captain in May 1942. Following his rescue from the Yorktown, Anderson returned to the United States where he served briefly with Marine Corps Base San Diego, California, and then with the 2nd Marine Division.

He was ordered to flight training at Naval Air Station Dallas, Texas in the spring of 1943. He was promoted to major in May 1943 and was awarded the gold wings of a naval aviator at Naval Air Station Pensacola, Florida in October 1943. His next assignment was as a flight instructor at Marine Corps Air Station Edenton, North Carolina. He remained there until December 1944, when he returned to duty in the Pacific Area and assumed command of Marine Bomber Squadron 443. He later served as the executive officer of Marine Aircraft Group 61 (MAG-61) in the consolidation of the Northern Solomons and the recapture of the Philippines.

== Post-World War II ==
In November 1945, Anderson returned to the United States and served in a wide variety of post-war assignments, including as a student at the Marine Corps Command and Staff College, Marine Corps Base Quantico, Virginia; Administration Officer, Division of Aviation, Headquarters Marine Corps (HQMC); and as the administration assistant to the assistant commandant for air, HQMC. He was promoted to lieutenant colonel in July 1949 and assigned to the Office of the Judge Advocate General, where he served in various branches while a post-graduate student at The George Washington University Law School.

In the summer of 1952, Anderson was ordered to Aircraft, Fleet Marine Force, Pacific, where he served as the executive officer for Marine Aircraft Group 16 until the spring of 1953 when he was ordered to Korea. In Korea, Anderson was the commanding officer, Marine Observation Squadron 6 (VMO-6), and later became the assistant chief of staff G-1, 1st Marine Aircraft Wing. Upon his return to the United States, he was assigned as the executive officer and then commanding officer of Marine Aircraft Group 26.

During May 1956, Anderson was assigned back to MCS, Quantico, Virginia, where he served first as an instructor, then Chief of the Air Section, Marine Corps Educational Center. He was promoted to colonel in October 1957 and, during the summer of 1959, was ordered to the Army War College, Carlisle Barracks, Pennsylvania. He graduated in June 1960 and was ordered to the 3rd Marine Aircraft Wing, where he served as the Staff Legal Officer until July 1961. He then assumed command of Marine Aircraft Group 36, Santa Ana, California, where his group participated in more than 13 separate amphibious and field exercises.

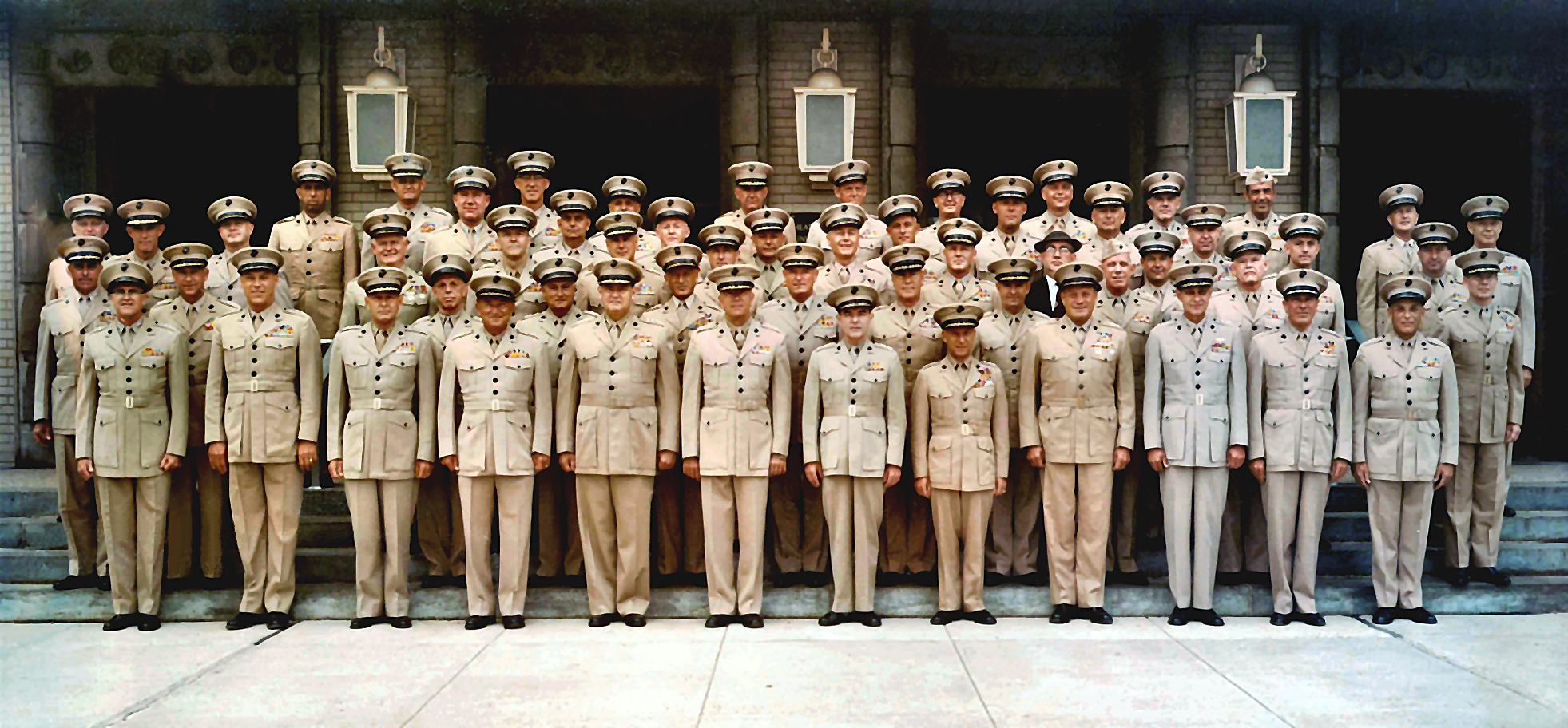
Anderson (2nd from right, 2nd row from top) at the 1967 General Officers Symposium

In June 1963, he became chief of staff of Military Assistance Advisory Group (MAAG), Vietnam and served in that capacity until the summer of 1964, when he returned to the U.S. For his service with the MAAG, he was awarded the Legion of Merit and gold stars in lieu of his 7th and 8th Air Medals. In the late summer of 1964, Anderson became the first program coordinator for the Marine Tactical Data System, the largest R&D effort in USMC history. He was promoted to brigadier general on January 3, 1966, and, in February, assumed duty as deputy chief of staff (RD&S), HQMC, the first aviator to be assigned that position. He also continued as the Marine Corps Tactical Data System Program Coordinator. For that duty he was awarded a gold star in lieu of a second Legion of Merit.

In December 1967, he returned to the Far East, where he assumed duty as the Chief of Staff III Marine Amphibious Force – Republic of Vietnam. He held that assignment until January 1969 and for his service was awarded a Navy Distinguished Service Medal. He also was awarded a Knight of the National Order of Vietnam, the Vietnamese Army Distinguished Service Order (1st Class), a Vietnamese Gallantry Cross with Palm, and a Korean Order of Military Merit Chungmu Cordon. While serving in Vietnam, he was promoted to major general on September 1, 1968. Upon his return to the United States, he reported to HQMC, where he served briefly as special assistant to the chief of staff. In March 1969, he was reassigned as deputy director, Personnel HQMC and the head of the personnel department, the first aviator to be assigned to those billets.

In 1970, he was appointed as the USMC member on the board of directors of the United States Olympic Committee and, in March 1971, was designated by the Secretary of Defense as the United States member of the executive committee of the Conseil International du Sport Militaire. In 1974, he was elected by the General Assembly to be the first vice president. He served as president and chairman of the board of directors of the Armed Forces Relief and Benefit Association (an insurance company catering to military servicemembers) from 1972 to 1975. He was promoted to lieutenant general in June 1971 and assumed duty as Commanding General Fleet Marine Force, Atlantic (FMFLant), Norfolk, Virginia, in July 1971. In April 1972, he was named the Assistant Commandant of the Marine Corps and promoted to general. At the age of 53, he became the youngest active duty Marine to be promoted to the rank of four-star general in the history of the Marine Corps.

== Public life ==
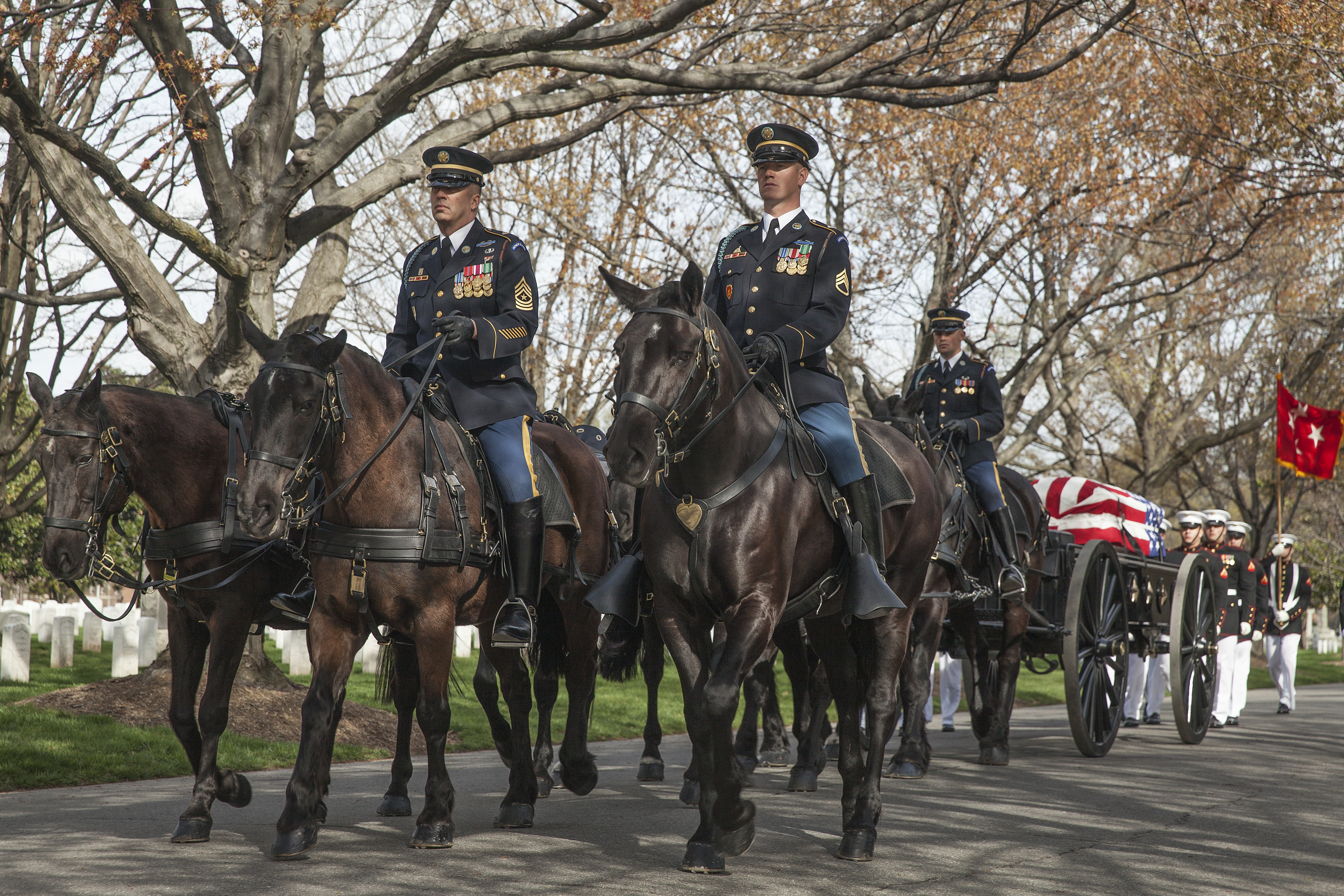
Funeral of Earl E. Anderson at Arlington National Cemetery (March 31, 2016)

In addition to his Bachelor of Science and Master of Arts degrees, Anderson also earned a Juris Doctor degree summa cum laude from George Washington University Law School (GWU). While attending, he won the first Law Review competition for writing the best law review article among second-year students. In his final year, he served as editor in chief of the GWU Law Review and was elected to the Order of the Coif. In November 1974, Anderson received the highest honor the GWU Law Association can bestow – the Distinguished Alumnus Award. He was also the recipient of Honorary Doctor of Law degrees from Thiel College and West Virginia University. He is a member of West Virginia University's Academy of Distinguished Alumni and its Order of Vandalia.

He was a member of the State Bar of California, the District of Columbia Bar, and the American Bar Association. He was entitled to practice before the United States Court of Appeals for the District of Columbia and the United States Supreme Court. In 1973 the State of West Virginia chose Anderson as the Son of the Year. He served on the executive council of the West Virginia University Alumni Council from 1971 to 1978, as its president from 1976 to 1977. Honoris Causa of The Mexican Academy on International Law, 1977. He was also the president of the Leatherneck Association. On November 12, 2015, Anderson died of a cerebral hemorrhage at Walter Reed National Military Medical Center in Bethesda, Maryland at the age of 96.

== Awards and decorations ==
Anderson's 49 instances of 26 distinct awards and decorations include:

Naval Aviator insignia
1st Row		Navy Distinguished Service Medal w/ 2 award stars		
2nd Row	Legion of Merit w/ 2 award stars & valor device	Distinguished Flying Cross w/ 1 award star	Bronze Star w/ valor device	Purple Heart
3rd Row	Air Medal w/ 7 award stars	Navy Presidential Unit Citation w/ 1 service star	Navy Unit Commendation w/ 1 service star	American Defense Service Medal w/ A Device
4th Row	American Campaign Medal	Asiatic-Pacific Campaign Medal w/ 4 service stars	World War II Victory Medal	National Defense Service Medal w/ 1 service star
5th Row	Korean Service Medal w/ 1 service star	Vietnam Service Medal w/ 6 service stars	Order of Military Merit, Chungmu Cordon Medal	National Order of Vietnam, Knight
6th Row	Vietnam Army Distinguished Service Order, 1st Class	Vietnam Gallantry Cross with palm (individual award)	Zaire National Order of Merit, Commander	Korean Presidential Unit Citation
7th Row	Vietnam Gallantry Cross unit citation	Philippine Liberation Medal	United Nations Korea Medal	Vietnam Campaign Medal
