= Marine Tactical Data System =

Marine Tactical Data System, commonly known as MTDS, was a mobile, ground based, aviation command and control system developed by the United States Marine Corps for the execution of anti-air warfare in support of the Fleet Marine Force (FMF). It was the Marine Corps' first semi-automated system capable of collecting, processing, computing and displaying aircraft surveillance data while also sharing that information with other participating units via tactical data link. The system was developed in the late 1950s/early 1960s when it was recognized that due to the speed, range and complexity of fighter aircraft operations effective air control and air defense demanded enhanced situational awareness.

MTDS was a spiral development of the United States Navy's Navy Tactical Data System (NTDS). At the time it was developed, it was the largest research and development project ever undertaken by the Marine Corps. Produced by Litton Systems Inc. in Van Nuys, California, MTDS took almost a decade to develop.

When fielded in September 1966, it was the premier air defense command and control system in the United States Military. It saw its widest operational use during the Vietnam War, where it was utilized to great effect controlling and deconflicting aircraft in the Northern portion of South Vietnam from July 1967 through to January 1971. MTDS remained the backbone of Marine Corps air defense operations until it was replaced by the AN/TYQ-23 Tactical Air Operations Module in the early 1990s.

== Background ==
=== Marine Corps Air Warning Program ===
The Marine Corps’ air warning program was developed during World War II to provide early warning and fighter control for Marine Corps forces ashore during amphibious operations. Through the 1950s Marine Corps air defense equipment and tactics continued to rely on manual plotting of air tracks based on voice calls from ground control intercept (GCI) controllers. By the mid-1950s, early warning, fighter control, and ground controlled intercept (GCI) were performed by the Marine Air Control Squadrons as part of Marine Aviation.

There were three MACS assigned to each Marine Amphibious Force. These squadrons provided air defense command and control centers known as Counter Air Operations Centers (CAOC) that relied on Marines to manually plot aircraft tracks on a large map based on voice or telephone calls from radar operators. Controllers manually calculated intercepts using vectors, headings, and speed.

=== Precursor systems and early development ===
In 1944, the British Air Force installed analog computers at Chain Home stations in order to automatically convert radar plots into map locations. After the war, the Royal Navy began to develop a command and control system known as the Comprehensive Display System (CDS) which further allowed operators the ability to assign identifications to objects on their radar screens. This made it easier for operators to vector friendly fighters onto intercept courses during ground controlled intercept. The United States Navy became very interested in the Comprehensive Display System after seeing a demonstration.

At the same time that the US Navy was looking to improve the air defense capabilities of the fleet, air defense in the United States also took on a much greater priority after the Soviet Union exploded its first nuclear weapon on 29 August 1949. The United States established a committee chaired by MIT professor George Valley, later to be known as the Valley Committee. The committee determined that the greatest threat to the nation's air defense was low-flying aircraft capable of avoiding widely dispersed GCI radars.

To counter this, the committee recommended that a large number of ground based radar systems be installed all over the United States to provide complete coverage. This large number of stations required a command and control center that could aggregate radar track data in real time. The amount of data necessary for this meant that it could not be done manually and would require a computer. Thus was born the Semi-Automatic Ground Environment also known as "SAGE." SAGE was a system of large computers and associated networking equipment that coordinated data from many radar sites and processed it to produce a single unified image of the airspace over a wide area.

In 1953, at the same time that the USAF was developing SAGE, the Naval Research Laboratory showed Marine Corps representatives the findings of its Electronic Tactical Data Systems program to determine the services' interest in any further development. There was no money at the time, however the Marine Corps continued to refine requirements for their future automated tactical data system for air defense operations. When the United States Navy eventually wrote the requirements for NTDS they included specifications for a ground-based unit to be developed by the Marine Corps.

The Chief of Naval Operations officially authorized the development of NTDS in April 1956. Concurrently, Headquarters Marine Corps, began to budget the system and further refine requirements. The requirements were developed by the Marine Corps Electronics Branch which was a department underneath the Electronics Development Division within the Navy's Bureau of Ships. When funds became available in 1957, a contract was awarded to Litton Systems Incorporated for the development of the Marine Tactical Data System.

== System ==
=== Major Components & Subcomponents ===
- AN/TYQ-1 - Tactical Air Command Center (TACC), produced by Philco Ford - Furnished the automatic displays and communications to provide for the overall command and coordination of all air operations in an area of operations.
- AN/TYQ-2 - Tactical Air Operations Center (TAOC), produced by Litton Industries - An operational complex of 14 shelters containing computers to track and process radar information and communications equipment for the execution of anti-air warfare.
  - AN/TYA-5 - Central Computer Group - shelter that contains the electronic data processing equipment that forms the core of the AN/TYQ-2.
  - AN/TYA-6 - Data Processor Group - transportable shelter containing 2D radar and electronic data processing equipment.
  - AN/TYA-7 - Geographic Display Generations Group - transportable shelter containing electronic scanning, mapping, and processing equipment.
  - AN/TYA-9 - Operator Group - shelter containing electronic data processing, display, and communications equipment.
  - AN/TYA-12 - Communications Group - shelter containing electronic digital and communication equipment.
  - AN/TYA-23 - Two shelters comprising the primary facilities for the test and repair of circuit plug-in cards and analog modules.
  - AN/TYA-25 - Photographic Transport Group - shelter containing commercial photographic equipment and developing facilities.
  - AN/TYA-26 - Ancillary Group - shelter containing the consoles and displays of associated radars and radio direction finding equipment.
  - AN/TYA - Maintenance Group - Two shelters for test and repair of the magnetic drum assembly, micropositioner, power supplies, and communications modules.
- AN/TYQ-3 - Tactical Data Communications Central (TDCC), produced by Litton Industries. - The system employed a UNIVAC CP-808 computer which was a light-weight version of the CP-642B utilized by NTDS. The TDCC hosted the critical operational software to drive MTDS and exchange air command and control data with NTDS and other joint command and control systems.
  - AN/TYA-20 - Shelter housing the CP-808 computer.

=== Design ===
MTDS consisted of three major components that worked in concert to automate early warning, fighter direction and the control of surface to air missiles within the Marine Air-Ground Task Force (MAGTF). Under MTDS, air defense within the Marine Corps was to be combined into a new agency known as the Tactical Air Operations Center (TAOC). The TAOC automated air defense functions which up to that point had to be completed manually. Operators could control more than 20 simultaneous intercepts while the computer tracked up to 250 air targets.

Ensuring that the entirety of the system was helicopter transportable was a major factor influencing much of the design of MTDS. Marine Corps forces operating from amphibious shipping needed the ability to sling load MTDS huts underneath helicopters in order to get it ashore during an amphibious operation. This meant that controlling the weight of each section of the system was critical and those weights were defined by the cargo carrying capacity of the Marine Corps helicopter fleet.

In its original design, MTDS planned to utilize TADIL-A/Link 11 to communicate between all participating Marine Corps units (TACC, LAAM, etc...) and the Navy's NTDS afloat. Early studies determined this would quickly overwhelm TADIL-A and create increased latency in the system. If track latency was too great then operators would not be able to properly control aircraft. There were also questions about the viability of utilizing high frequency radio waves in mountainous terrain where the Marine Corps may need to operate. To overcome these deficiencies, the Marine Corps investigated an emerging technology known as tropospheric scatter. This eventually led to the development of the AN/TRC-97 built by RCA. The TRC-97 provided data, voice and teletype connectivity for MTDS and would grow to become the backbone of USMC and USAF long haul communications for years to come.

Early in the design phase of MTDS, it was decided to use magnetic drum memory computers. Memory drums were used as the digital storage elements and system clock pulse generators in the Central Computer Group and each of the Radar and Identification Data Processors (RIDP). The drums utilized had a capacity of 1,123,200 bits and operated at a speed of 2667 revolutions per minute (rpm), and generated a clock frequency of 333 cycles per second.

There were no issues with this design until shortly after preduction had begun in 1964. At that time a senior defense official questioned the efficacy of drum memory computers and requested a review of the program. Production was halted in order to examine whether the system would be better off utilizing magnetic-core memory computers. After a few month delay, the Marine Corps was able to show that the drum memory system already in place met all reliability requirements set forth for the program. Production of the system was allowed to continue.

=== Testing ===
In the early 1960s, Marine Air Control Squadron 3 (MACS-3) at Marine Corps Air Station Santa Ana, California was administratively detached from the I Marine Amphibious Force and moved under Air, Fleet Marine Forces Pacific for purposes of testing MTDS equipment and operational concepts.

MACS-3 Sub-Unit 1 located at Marine Corps Base Twentynine Palms, CA took delivery of the second MTDS system in September 1962.

In 1963, the program was in serious trouble and then Commandant of the Marine Corps General David M. Shoup named Colonel Earl E. Anderson as the first program manager for MTDS.

In March 1965, MACS-3 accepted the first production model of MTDS for operational testing. System development and testing were completed in October 1965.

=== Training & Fielding ===
MACS-3 graduated its first class of MTDS operators and maintainers on 8 October 1963. The initial course was twenty weeks long for maintainers and six weeks long for operators. Classroom instructions was provided by the Marines of MACS-3, field representatives from Litton Industries and civilians from the US Navy's Naval Aviation Engineering Service Unit.

MTDS began fielding to the operating forces in July 1966 with the last system fielding in August 1973.

MTDS was replaced by the AN/TYQ-23 Tactical Air Operations Module (TAOM), a joint USAF/USMC program. Development of the AN/TYQ-23 began in the early 1980s and coincided with the development of the USMC's next generation long range radar, the AN/TPS-59. Operational testing lasted from 1985 through 1991. Testing was not complete before the beginning of Gulf War in 1990 therefore Marine Air Control Squadron 2 utilized MTDS when combat operations commenced in January 1991. Fielding of the AN/TYQ-23 began shortly after the end of the Gulf War and MTDS was concurrently removed from the Marine Corps inventory.

== Operational use ==
The first MTDS system fielded to the Fleet Marine Force was given to Marine Air Control Squadron 4 at Marine Corps Base Camp Pendleton, California in September 1966. Shortly thereafter the squadron was informed that they were deploying to South Vietnam to replace Marine Air Control Squadron 7 (MACS-7). In November 1966 they sent an advanced party to scout the best locations for MTDS in country. They eventually decided upon the Monkey Mountain Facility near Danang. This site was chosen because of it was co-located with the HAWK Missile Batteries of the 1st Light Antiaircraft Missile Battalion and the United States Air Force's Panama Air Control Facility. The site also provided excellent line of sight to United States Seventh Fleet ships operating in Yankee Station in the Gulf of Tonkin.

MACS-4 arrived in Vietnam in June 1967 and was established and operating on top of Monkey Mountain beginning 6 July 1967. On 13 January 1971 at 0001, MACS-4 made its last tactical transmission in support of operations during the Vietnam War. During its time in Vietnam utilizing MTDS, MACS-4 controlled or assisted 472,146 aircraft.

Even though MACS-4 departed Vietnam on 31 January 1971 it maintained a small detachment of twenty Marines on top of Monkey Mountain to man the AN/TYQ-3 - Tactical Data Communications Central (TDCC). The AN/TYQ-3 facilitated critical data exchange between the USAF and USN during the later stages of the Vietnam War. This detachment remained in support of operations until 14 February 1973.

In 1969, the Marine Corps fielded the AN/TPS-32 radar which was the service's first phased array three dimensional radar and was optimized for operations with MTDS.

== Legacy ==
The development of MTDS coincided with the fielding of the MIM-23 HAWK Missile system, and the AN/TPQ-10 Radar Course Directing Central. The arrival of these highly technical systems, and the concurrent need for specialists to operate them, was a catalyst for the professionalization of aviation command and control in the Marine Corps. Recognizing the need for a separate headquarters to oversee these specialized units and the agencies and equipment they provide, the Marine Corps recommissioned the Marine Air Control Groups in September 1967. This laid the foundation for what is now known as the Marine Air Command and Control System (MACCS).

Testing and fielding of MTDS along with various other automated systems in the 1960s highlighted that the Marine Corps was not properly staffed to develop, test and acquire new digital equipment. Lessons learned from MTDS's testing and development and the recognized need to support current and future tactical data systems led to the development of the Marine Corps Tactical Systems Support Activity (MCTSSA) based at MCB Camp Pendleton, CA. MCTSSA was organized in 1970 and its structure came from MACS-3 which was concurrently decommissioned.

== See also ==
- Joint Electronics Type Designation System – Unclassified designation system for United States military electronic equipment
- United States Marine Corps Aviation
- List of United States Marine Corps aviation support squadrons
- List of military electronics of the United States
