= Air Control =

2014 video game

- Developer: Killjoy Games
- Publisher: Killjoy Games
- Engine: Unity
- Platform: Microsoft Windows
- Release: May 23, 2014; 12 years ago
- Mode: Single-player

Air Control is a 2014 video game developed by Russian indie studio Killjoy Games and released May 23, 2014. It is based on the Unity 5 game engine. The game was panned by critics. It was removed from Steam within several months of its release.

== Gameplay ==
In casual mode and realistic mode, the player acts as a flight attendant in an aircraft initially. After enough service as a flight attendant to humans, the player then becomes an attendant for zombies, which then transitions to a first person shooter. Eventually it becomes a flight simulator, allowing the player to control an aircraft.

Killjoy mode allows the player to use a set of keys to control an aircraft from the exterior.

== Reception ==
Reviewers panned Air Control. Adam Smith, writing for Rock, Paper, Shotgun pre-release, compared the game to a "trashy B movie experience", remarking "so it's good that it's bad!", and wasn't sure whether "there [was] any flight simulation at all". Alexander Pushkar, writing for Russian website Igromania, also pre-release, was hyperbolic about the effects the game had on his mental state and stated that the game has no right to exist. Kevin VanOrd, writing for GameSpot, called the game a "travesty, [...] homely, unfinished, and inept." Tyler Wilde, writing for PC Gamer, called the game "one giant bug" and advised players not to purchase the game. Wilde also found that the game contains audio from the Delta Air Lines safety video.

== Developer reaction ==
PC Gamer journalists managed to contact the game's developer, Ramil Nassyrov, who was 20 years old at the time. He disagreed with the journalist's opinion about the large number of errors in the game, noting that the game is "a bit hardcore" and "requires practice." After that, Nassyrov promised to release regular updates.

Further reaction by Nassyrov included deleting and banning Steam users from discussion boards which brought criticism and questioning to the game, and even went as far as to add friends with people who showed positive reviews or support for the game, or boldly claiming that their PCs "were not powerful enough", and even writing derogatory personal attacks toward critics of the game.

== See also ==
- List of video games notable for negative reception
