= Marine Air Control Squadron 2 =

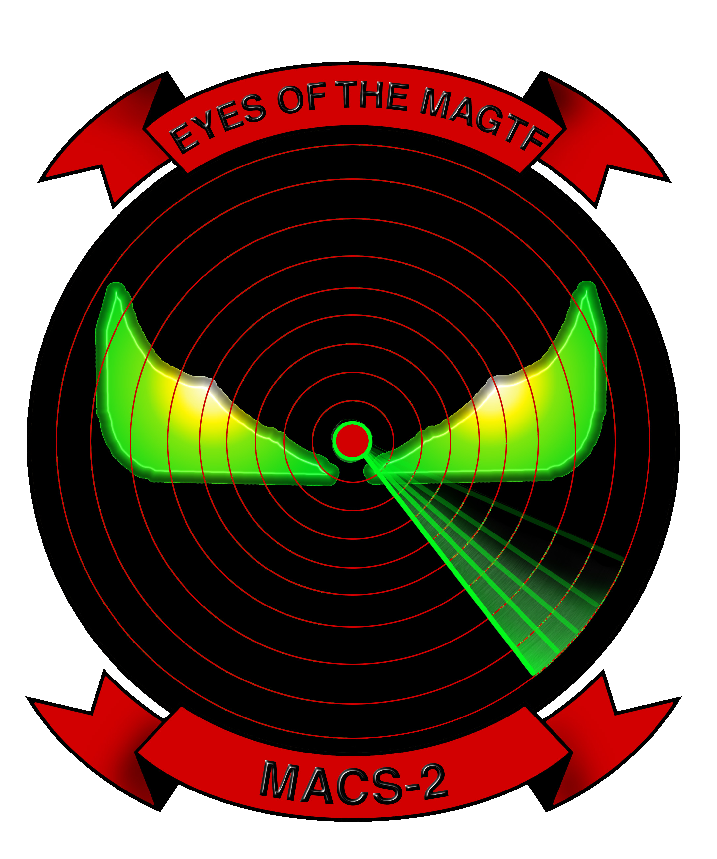
- MACS-2 Insignia
- Active: 1 April 1944 – present
- Country: United States of America
- Branch: United States Marine Corps
- Type: Aviation Command & Control
- Role: Aerial surveillance & Air traffic control
- Part of: Marine Air Control Group 28; 2nd Marine Aircraft Wing
- Garrison/HQ: Marine Corps Air Station Cherry Point
- Nicknames: "Eyes of the MAGTF" "MACS Deuce"
- Engagements: World War II; Operation Desert Storm; Operation Enduring Freedom; Operation Iraqi Freedom

Commanders
- Current commander: Lieutenant Colonel George Getman Jr.

Marine Air Control Squadron 2 (MACS-2) is a United States Marine Corps aviation command and control squadron. The squadron provides aerial surveillance, Ground-controlled interception, and air traffic control for the II Marine Expeditionary Force. They are based at Marine Corps Air Station Cherry Point and fall under Marine Air Control Group 28 and the 2nd Marine Aircraft Wing.

== Mission ==
Detect, identify and control the intercept of hostile aircraft and missiles, and provide navigational assistance to friendly aircraft and provide continuous all-weather, radar, non-radar approach, departure, en route and tower air traffic control services to friendly aircraft.

The unit manages anti-air warfare assets within assigned sector. It detects, identifies and classifies all aircraft within its assigned sector. It maintain tracks of identified contacts and provide en route control/navigation assistance as required. MACS-2 selects and assign weapons to engage and defeat enemy air threats. It controls the engagement of enemy air threats by increasing interceptors or surface-to-air weapons. It provides radar/non-radar approach, departure and en route air traffic control services within assigned terminal control areas. It provides automatic carrier landing system approach services (Modes I, II, and III) for forward operating bases. Finally it coordinates air defense activities within designated base defense zones.

Primary Missions

- Air Traffic Control
- Early Warning & Control
- Air Intercept Control
- Mutil-TADIL interface and management

== Subordinate units ==
Name	Location
Headquarters and Support Detachment	MCAS Cherry Point
Air Traffic Control Detachment Alpha	MCAS Beaufort
Air Traffic Control Detachment Bravo	MCAS New River
Air Traffic Control Detachment Charlie	Marine Corps Auxiliary Landing Field Bogue
Early Warning Control Detachment	MCAS Beaufort
Tactical Air Operations Center Detachment	MCAS Cherry Point

== History ==
=== World War II ===
Marine Air Warning Squadron 11 was commissioned on April 1, 1944 at Marine Corps Air Station Cherry Point, North Carolina, under the command of Marine Air Warning Group 1, 9th Marine Aircraft Wing. In June 1944, the squadron relocated to Marine Corps Air Station Miramar, California and was assigned to Marine Air Warning Group 2. In March 1945, the squadron relocated once again, this time assigned to the 3rd Marine Aircraft Wing at Pearl Harbor, Territory of Hawaii. The squadron left Hawaii in late May 1945 and arrived on Okinawa on July 4, 1945. On July 17, AWS-11 was moved to Kume Shima and was joined to Marine Aircraft Group 43 of the 2nd Marine Aircraft Wing. The squadron remained there until after the surrender of Japan.

In October 1945, the squadron moved viz LSTsto Qingdao, China to join Marine Aircraft Group 24, 1st Marine Aircraft Wing, and participated in the occupation of Northern China until May 1946. Proceeding from North China, the squadron moved once again to Miramar, California and in August 1946, was redesignated as Marine Ground Control Intercept Squadron 2, a member of Marine Air Warning Group 2, where it remained until its deactivation on October 15, 1947.

=== Reactivation and movement to Hawaii ===
During the buildup to the Korean War, Marine Ground Control Intercept Squadron 2 was reactivated in El Toro, California on 3 August 1950. In January 1952, the squadron was attached to Marine Aircraft Group 13 and two months later moved with MAG-13 to Kaneohe Bay, Territory of Hawaii. On 15 February 1954, the Squadron was redesignated as Marine Air Control Squadron 2, and four years later in November 1958, relocated to Atsugi, Japan. In March 1959, MACS-2 joined the First Marine Brigade and returned to Kaneohe Bay, Hawaii.

On May 19, 1962, elements of MACS-2 deployed to Udorn Royal Thai Air Force Base, Thailand as part of a buildup of US forces in Thailand in response to the worsening situation of the Royal Lao Government in the Laotian Civil War. In July 1962 the squadron's elements received orders to depart Thailand. They travelled via rail to Bangkok and departed Thailand via United States Navy shipping.

=== Desert Shield/Desert Storm ===
In August 1990, MACS-2 received orders to deploy to Southwest Asia in support of Operation Desert Shield, and on 6 September 1990, arrived in Saudi Arabia. Establishing a Tactical Air Operations Center (TAOC) in the vicinity of King Abdul Aziz Naval Base (KAANB), MACS-2 provided a base defense zone for KAANB and the port of Jubail. On 29 December 1990, MACS-2 displaced to Ras Mishab port, harbor, and airfield complex, establishing the primary TAOC eight miles west, to provide anti-air warfare capabilities in support of MARCENT and I Marine Expeditionary Force air and ground operations. During Operation Desert Storm in February 1991, an Early Warning and Control (EW/C) site deployed with the ground combat element through the breach to Ahmad al-Jaber Air Base in the Kingdom of Kuwait. Upon cessation of hostilities, MACS-2 was redeployed to MCAS Kaneohe Bay, Hawaii in March 1991, in support of Marine Aircraft Group 24, 1st Marine Expeditionary Brigade.

=== Leaving Hawaii and varied operations ===
In 1993, MACS-2 was disbanded in Hawaii and MACS-5 at the Marine Corps Air Station Beaufort, South Carolina was redesignated as MACS-2, subordinate to Marine Aircraft Group 31 (MAG-31). While supporting MAG-31 in 1994, MACS-2 acquired Air Traffic Control (ATC) Detachments A and B. Between 1995 and 1998, MACS-2 participated in Joint Task Force Six, also known as Operation Lone Star, a drug interdiction operation patrolling the Mexico–United States border. Further drug interdiction operations included EC-7 in 1996 in Ecuador and Operation Laser Strike in 1997 conducted in Peru. ATC detachments C and D joined MACS-2 in 1998.

MACS-2 relocated once more to MCAS Cherry Point in 1998 under Marine Air Control Group 28 where it resides today. Deployed in support of overseas operations, MACS-2 sent an ATC detachment known as a Marine Air Traffic Control Mobile Team (MMT) to Kosovo with the 26th Marine Expeditionary Unit in 1999. In support of operations in Serbia, MACS-2 deployed an MMT to Hungary, also in 1999. In 2001, MACS-2 sent Tactical Air Operations Center Marines to Southwest Asia to support the United States Air Force in Operation Southern Watch. The squadron also provided an ATC detachment to the 2002 Winter Olympics in Salt Lake City, Utah.

=== Wars in Iraq and Afghanistan ===
In early 2003 MACS-2 sent a detachment of over 50 Marines to support the initial phase of Operation Iraqi Freedom. Consisting mostly of Six-man Mobile Air Traffic Control Teams (MMTs), the Marines of MACS-2 were instrumental in providing operational capability for Forward Arming and Refueling Points (FARPs) and Forward Air Bases (FOBs), ensuring air superiority for the coalition forces from the Kuwait border through Baghdad and as far north as Tikrit. An MMT team attached to MWSS-371 took part in the Battle of Ah Nasiriyah from 26 to 29 March 2003, with one air traffic control sustaining shrapnel wounds that earned him a purple heart.

A detachment from Marine Air Control Squadron 2 make up the Air Traffic Control Detachment at Djibouti-Ambouli International Airport in support of Combined Joint Task Force - Horn of Africa in early 2003. Members of the detachment work with Djiboutian and French air traffic controllers in the control tower to ensure military and civilian aircraft land and take off safely at the airport. Marines served as the liaison between the American pilots and the French and Djiboutian controllers.

From 2009 through 2014, MACS-2, in concert with MACS-1, supported sustained TAOC operations at Camp Leatherneck, in Helmand Province, Afghanistan. MACS-2 first brought the TAOC and AN/TPS-59 radar into Helmand Province in 2009 replacing the Royal Air Force's No. 1 Air Control Centre. These units were responsible for controlling 70,000 square miles of airspace in support of Regional Command Southwest operations. From 2009 through 2014, both MACS-1 and MACS-2 coordinated more than 320,000 fixed-wing operations, 80,000 aerial refueling operations, and more than 7,000 rotary wing operations. The TAOC's mission in Afghanistan ended in November 2013 as the Marine Corps withdrew its presence in Southern Afghanistan and turned over control of the area to United States Air Force's 71st Expeditionary Air Control Squadron.

== Unit awards ==
A unit citation or commendation is an award bestowed upon an organization for the action cited. Members of the unit who participated in said actions are allowed to wear on their uniforms the awarded unit citation. Marine Air Control Squadron 2 has been presented with the following awards:

Streamer	Award	Year(s)	Additional Info
	Navy Unit Commendation Streamer with two Bronze Stars	1990, 2005–2006, 2009	Southwest Asia, Iraq
	Meritorious Unit Commendation Streamer with two Bronze Stars	1985–87, 1988–1989, 1998–1999	
	Asiatic-Pacific Campaign Streamer	1945	Okinawa
	World War II Victory Streamer	1941–1945	Pacific War
	Navy Occupation Service Streamer with "ASIA"		
	China Service Streamer	1945-46	
	National Defense Service Streamer with three Bronze Stars	1950–1954, 1961–1974, 1990–1995, 2001–present	Korean War, Vietnam War, Gulf War, war on terrorism
	Southwest Asia Service Streamer with two Bronze Stars	September 1990 – February 1991	Desert Shield, Desert Storm
A multicolored streamer with (from outer to inner) green, red, black (the three colors of the Afghan flag), white, red, and white again horizontal stripes with a blue horizontal stripe in the center	Afghanistan Campaign Streamer with one Bronze Star		
	Iraq Campaign Streamer with two Bronze Stars		
	Global War on Terrorism Expeditionary Streamer		
	Global War on Terrorism Service Streamer	2001–present	

== See also ==
- United States Marine Corps Aviation
- List of United States Marine Corps aviation support units

== See also ==
- MACS-2’s official website. Retrieved on 26 December 2024.
