= Marine Corps Tactical Systems Support Activity =

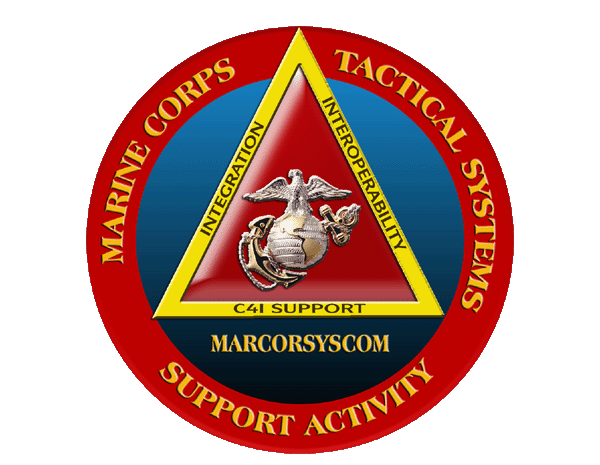
- MCTSSA Insignia
- Country: United States
- Allegiance: United States of America
- Branch: United States Marine Corps
- Role: C4I Integration
- Part of: Marine Corps Systems Command
- Garrison/HQ: Marine Corps Base Camp Pendleton

Commanders
- Current commander: Lieutenant Colonel Michael Liguori

The Marine Corps Tactical Systems Support Activity (MCTSSA) is the Marine Air-Ground Task Force (MAGTF) Command, Control, Communication, Computer, Intelligence (C4I) Integration center for the United States Marine Corps. They are a component of Marine Corps Systems Command (MARCORSYSCOM) and are located at Marine Corps Base Camp Pendleton, California.

== Mission ==
MCTSSA is the Marine Corps' organization for integration, interoperability, and technical support for tactical C4I systems to ensure Marines continue to win battles by:

- Providing technical support to the Commanding General, MARCORSYSCOM, and Program Managers to acquire and sustain Command, Control, Communication, Computer, Intelligence, Surveillance, and Reconnaissance (C4ISR) products for the Operating Forces.
- Providing technical support to the Operating Forces for fielded command and control systems.
- Providing technical support to the Deputy Commander for C4I Integration, MARCORSYSCOM, for systems engineering and integration.
- Providing a Systems Integration Environment.

== History ==
Marine Corps leaders, with the advent of automation, saw the need within the Marine Corps for a single focal point for computer driven tactical systems. Marine leaders founded MCTSSA to support the technology requirements of the C4ISR community. As Marines learned how to take advantage of automation, MCTSSA monitored tactical systems development and prepared for transition and fielding to the Operating Forces. Requirements changed as computers grew in memory, power, and downsized. MCTSSA met the evolving C4ISR needs by changing their core competencies, workforce skill sets, size and composition, infrastructure, facility, and organizational structure. In 1970, the Marine Corps took ownership of its first computer based Command and Control (C2) System.

Initially MCTSSA was assigned to the Marine Corps Development & Education Command (MCDEC) at Marine Corps Base Quantico, Virginia and was funded totally with RDT&E dollars. The command was functionally organized into a Headquarters element, Programming Branch, Test Branch, Configuration Management (CM)/ Quality Assurance (QA) Branch, and Maintenance Branch. The skill set of the workforce was predominantly software programmers, CM & QA specialists, test specialists, data link interoperability experts, operational Marines and maintenance Marines. There were no Project Officers, Fund Administrators, or Contracting Officers on the compound. The only support contractors on the compound were for hardware maintenance. When the Position, Location, and Reporting System (PLRS) was fielded in 1977, MCTSSA became the software support facility for that Joint Service system. The other Services sent money to MCTSSA to pay for software updates. MCTSSA completed its first decade as a specialist in software support to the Tactical Air Operations Center (TAOC) and PLRS systems.

In the 1980s, computers started to become small and powerful enough to begin to find their way into tactical applications within the Ground Combat Element. The decade brought a revolution in how a MAGTF could take advantage of technology and move into the “digital” age. The result was a bow wave of computer-based C4ISR systems moving through the acquisition pipeline and ultimately being fielded. The object for both Program Managers and industry was to build the best special purpose “stovepipe” system possible. Program Managers had little or no experience with the acquisition of digital systems or planning for post deployment software support. This increase in the acquisition of computer systems required MCTSSA to begin supporting dozens of Program Managers as new systems worked their way through the acquisition milestones.

New skill sets were needed by the MCTSSA workforce in order to provide software engineering and software support expertise to Marine Corps Program Managers. Systems acquisition expertise, software/firmware design, software/firmware development and IV&V became important skills in supporting the Program Managers. Support contractors were brought on board in record numbers to augment the workforce. MCTSSA was reorganized into commodity divisions such as Air, Ground, Communications, and Intelligence in order to support both the Operating Forces and Acquisition process. The degree of technology in these systems was unanticipated at the beginning of the decade. However, MCTSSA was able to develop the capability to become a major influence on the acquisition and support of Marine Corps tactical C4 systems.

In the late 1980s, the Marine Corps established the Marine Corps Systems Command (MARCORSYSCOM) and MCTSSA was removed from MCDEC and assigned to the new command. MCTSSA now had an O&M, MC budget for operating expenses and post deployment support as well as an RDT&E budget for specific system support. There were many Project Officers, Fund Administrators, and contractors on the compound. Building 57 was POMed for, and eventually built, to house all the additional people. MCTSSA ended the decade supporting the acquisition and post deployment support of a variety of tactical C4 systems spread out across a number of MAGTF elements. Exactly what the Marine Corps needed.

The 1990s saw an increasing number of C4I systems being developed and eventually the advent of “systems of systems” as the Marine Corps connected these new C4I systems together. First it was peer-to-peer connections and then ever widening circles of local area networks, wide area networks, and eventually the Internet cloud. The ability to produce a common operational picture and to share it with others became a reality. MEFs struggled with Unix operating systems and MEUs struggled with Microsoft Windows. The concepts of standard hardware, standard operating systems, common operating environments, and software applications as “plug-ins” began to emerge. Stovepipe systems became less desirable as integration and interoperability became more important. The need for software programmers at MCTSSA dwindled to just a few.

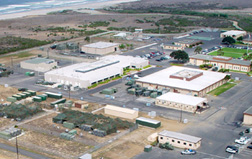
Picture taken overhead the MCTSSA compound on the Camp Pendleton coast.

Joint interoperability became an operational necessity rather than just an optional capability. MCTSSA became the USMC facility for participation in all Joint TADIL/Message Certification testing (JINTACCS). MCTSSA was an early champion and leader of these new concepts.

In 1992, the initial Letter of intent (LOI) that established the Systems Integration Environment at MCTSSA was signed. MCTSSA contributed to the development and architecture of C4I systems in this decade. MCTSSA developed the skill sets to deal with the standard operating systems, common operating environment, integration of systems, networks, and systems interoperability. As the number of “networked” systems in the Operating Forces increased, MCTSSA support to the Operating Forces increased. Due to the dramatic increase in demand for MCTSSA support, additional Project Officer and Project Engineer billets were added to the MCTSSA T/O and a contracting office was established. Contractor support assigned to the Divisions made up a larger percentage of the workforce. MCTSSA completed the decade poised to support Marine Corps C4ISR systems in the 21st century.

== See also ==
- Organization of the United States Marine Corps
