= Marine Air Control Squadron 4 =

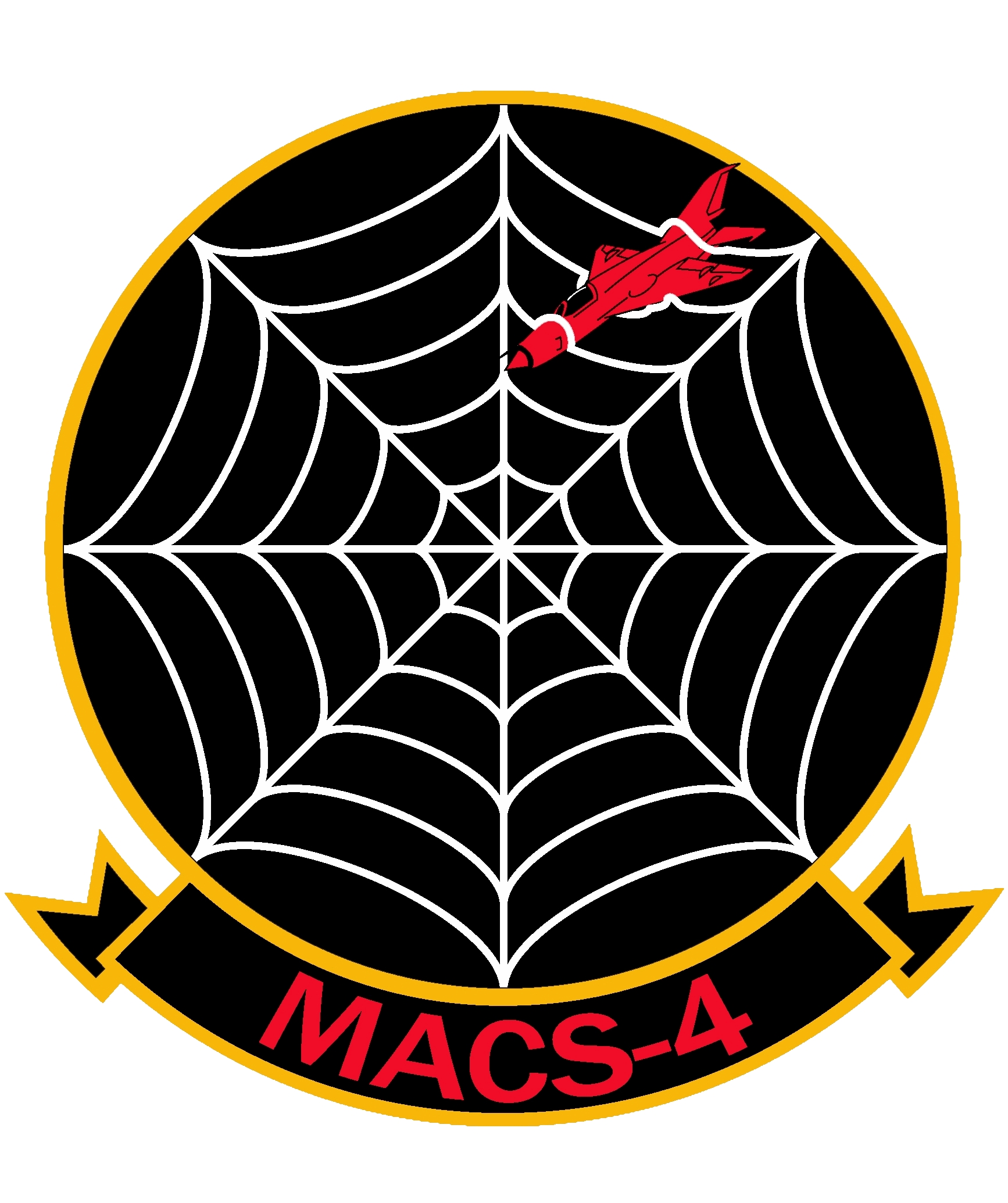
- MACS-4 Insignia
- Active: 5 May 1944 – 30 Apr 1947; 30 Jun 1951 – 31 Jan 1971; 15 Jun 1971 – present
- Country: United States of America
- Branch: United States Marine Corps
- Type: Aviation Command & Control
- Role: Aerial surveillance & Air traffic control
- Part of: Marine Air Control Group 18; 1st Marine Aircraft Wing
- Garrison/HQ: Marine Corps Air Station Futenma
- Nickname: Huntsman
- Engagements: Vietnam War; Operation Enduring Freedom

Commanders
- Current commander: LtCol James B. Holderbaum

Marine Air Control Squadron 4 (MACS-4) is a United States Marine Corps aviation command and control squadron that provides aerial surveillance, Ground-controlled interception, and air traffic control for the III Marine Expeditionary Force. Originally formed in World War II, the squadron's most notable combat operations occurred during the Vietnam War when it was the first unit to ever use the Marine Tactical Data System. They are currently based at Marine Corps Air Station Futenma and fall under the command of Marine Air Control Group 18 and the 1st Marine Aircraft Wing.

== Subordinate units ==
The squadron is currently structured as follows:

Name	Location
Headquarters and Service Company	MCAS Futenma
Air Traffic Control Company K	MCAS Futenma
Air Traffic Control Company L	MCAS Iwakuni
Air Traffic Control Company M	MCAS Kaneohe Bay
Air Defense Company A	MCAS Futenma

== Mission ==
Provide air surveillance and the control of aircraft and Surface-To-Air weapons for antiair warfare; Continuous All-Weather radar and Non-Radar air traffic control service, and airspace management in support of a Marine Air-Ground Task Force (MAGTF)

== History ==
=== Early years ===
Air Warning Squadron 13 was commissioned 5 May 1944 at Marine Corps Air Station Cherry Point, North Carolina and assigned to 1st Marine Air Warning Group, 9th Marine Aircraft Wing. On 12 August 1944 the squadron moved to Naval Air Station Vero Beach, Florida to assist in the air control program and give squadron personnel experience in night intercept problems. The squadron was responsible for operating an SCR-527 radar at Sebastian, the SCR-270 radars at Stuart and Roseland and the Radio direction finder (RDF) stations at Melbourne, Vero Beach and Stuart. The squadron departed NAS Vero Beach on 7 June 1945 heading for the west coast. They were redesignated 1 August 1946 to Marine Ground Control Intercept Squadron 4 and assigned to Marine Air Control Group 2. The squadron was decommissioned 30 April 1947.

They were reactivated 30 June 1951 at Marine Corps Air Station Santa Ana, California and assigned to Marine Air Control Group 3, Air Fleet Marine Force, Pacific. Re-designated 15 February 1954 as Marine Air Control Squadron 4. They moved in July 1959 to Marine Corps Air Station Iwakuni, Japan and were assigned to Marine Wing Headquarters Group, 1st Marine Aircraft Wing. Their first deployment was to Thailand during May–July 1962 in connection with communist threat to that country.

=== Vietnam War ===
The squadron was relocated again to Marine Corps Base Camp Pendleton, California in October 1965. In late May 1967, MACS-4 departed San Diego onboard the USS Hermitage (LSD-34) and landed in Danang, Republic of Vietnam. The squadron was emplaced at the Monkey Mountain Facility on Monkey Mountain east of Danang and was the first to utilize the newly fielded Marine Tactical Data System (MTDS). They began operations on July 6, 1967. This site was chosen because of it was co-located with the HAWK Missile Batteries of the 1st Light Antiaircraft Missile Battalion and the United States Air Force's Panama Air Control Facility. The site also provided excellent line of sight to United States Seventh Fleet ships operating in Yankee Station in the Gulf of Tonkin. On September 1, 1967 the squadron was reassigned to the newly commissioned Marine Air Control Group 18 (MACG-18), 1st Marine Aircraft Wing. MACS-4 provided positive radar control for the Marine Corps' area of operations in I Corps Tactical Zone. On 13 January 1971 at 0001, MACS-4 made its last tactical transmission in support of operations during the Vietnam War. During its time in Vietnam utilizing MTDS, MACS-4 controlled or assisted 472,146 aircraft. The squadron departed Vietnam embarking on the USS Alamo (LSD-33) on January 31, 1971 to head back to MCAS Santa Ana, California. The squadron was decommissioned the same day it left Vietnam and was reactivated on June 15, 1971 at Marine Corps Air Station Futenma in Okinawa, Japan remaining part of MACG-18. Even though MACS-4 departed Vietnam on January 31, 1971 it maintained a small detachment of twenty Marines on top of Monkey Mountain to man the AN/TYQ-3 - Tactical Data Communications Central (TDCC). The AN/TYQ-3 facilitated critical data exchange between the USAF and USN during the later stages of the Vietnam War. This detachment remained in support of operations until 14 February 1973.

=== Global war on terror ===
Elements of the squadron participated in support of Operation Enduring Freedom, April 2002 through March 2004.

== Unit awards ==
A unit citation or commendation is an award bestowed upon an organization for the action cited. Members of the unit who participated in said actions are allowed to wear on their uniforms the awarded unit citation. MACS-4 has been presented with the following awards:

Streamer	Award	Year(s)	Additional Info
	Presidential Unit Citation Streamer	1967	Vietnam
	Joint Meritorious Unit Award Streamer	1990	JTF-4
A green streamer with red, gold, and blue horizontal stripes along the top and bottom with one silver star in the center	Navy Unit Commendation Streamer with one Bronze Star	1967-1968, 2002-2003	Vietnam, Afghanistan
	Meritorious Unit Commendation Streamer with one silver star	1982-1984, 1985–1987, 1997–1999, 2000-2002, 2004-2005, 2008-2010	
	Marine Corps Expeditionary Streamer	1962	Thailand
	American Campaign Streamer	1944-1946	
	World War II Victory Streamer	1944–1946	
A red streamer with a horizontal gold stripe and three bronze stars in the center	National Defense Service Streamer with three Bronze Stars	1951–1954, 1961–1974, 1990–1995, 2001–present	Korean War, Vietnam War, Gulf War, war on terrorism
	Global War on Terrorism Expeditionary Streamer	2002-2004	Afghanistan
	Global War on Terrorism Service Streamer	2001–2022	
	Vietnam Service Streamer with two Silver Stars	1967-1971	
A gold streamer with red horizontal stripes on the outer portions and a green palm in the center	Vietnam Gallantry Cross with Palm Streamer	1967-1969	
A green streamer with red horizontal stripes	Vietnam Meritorious Unit Citation Civil Actions Streamer	1969-1970	

== See also ==
- Organization of the United States Marine Corps
- List of United States Marine Corps aviation support squadrons
