= Lockheed Martin Global Training and Logistics =

Coordinates: 28.5407°N 81.214°W

Lockheed Martin Training and Logistics Solutions (TLS) (formerly known as Global Training and Logistics (GTS)), which was created from two separate entities combined into one business unit ('Simulation, Training & Support' & ISGS-Readiness and Stability Operations') is a Lockheed Martin line of business headquartered in Orlando, FL. The company's simulation business is focused on supplying training for military and commercial platforms, as well as staff training. The company's training and logistics division provides US Military and Foreign military training and logistics throughout the World. TLS employees span the globe working at military, Lockheed Martin, and other defense sites. The company is a provider of modeling, simulation, and mission rehearsal tools for military and civilian applications. Military logistics support and test equipment is also a large portion of their business, including machinery controls, logistics management systems, and automated test solutions for air, land and sea.

Other major LM TLS facilities are located in Fort Worth, TX; Huntsville, AL; Akron, OH; Burlington, MA; the Washington, D.C. metropolitan area; La Mesa, Mexico; and the United Kingdom.

In 2012, GTL was combined with Mission Systems and Sensors to form Mission Systems & Training (LM MST).
