= Vance D. Coffman =

- Born: April 3, 1944 (age 82); Kinross, Iowa, U.S.
- Education: Iowa State University, Stanford University
- Occupation: Business leadership

Vance D. Coffman (born April 3, 1944) was the former chairman of the board and chief executive officer of Lockheed Martin Corporation. He has additionally served on the board of directors for 3M, John Deere, and Amgen.

== Early life and education ==
Coffman was born April 3, 1944, in Kinross, Iowa, a very small town. His father was a farmer and grew soybeans, grain and corn. In 1949, the family moved to Winthrop, Iowa, where he attended East Buchanan High School.

He is a 1967 B.S. graduate in Aerospace Engineering of Iowa State University (ISU). Coffman had three brothers, all of which studied at ISU within the engineering and science departments. Coffman has Master's and Doctorate graduate in Aeronautics and Astronautics from Stanford University.

== Work ==
In 1967, Coffman joined Lockheed Corporation's Space Systems Division, working on the development of space programs and data processing systems for the corporation. By 1988 he was president of the Space Systems Division. He directed the Hubble Space Telescope project for Lockheed. By 1998 he was the chairman and CEO of Lockheed Martin, until he retired as CEO in 2004, followed by a retirement as chairman in 2005 after 38 years of service.

Starting in 2002, Coffman served as a member of the 3M company's Board of Directors, and by 2006 he was elected as a Lead Director of the Board of Directors.

In 2004, Coffman was elected to the Board of Directors for John Deere.

In 2007, the biotechnology company Amgen elected Coffman to the Board of Directors.

== Awards and honorary degrees ==
In 1999, Coffman was awarded from his alma mater Iowa State University the Distinguished Achievement Citation, followed by a 2006 awarded honorary doctorate of science for his work in technical and managerial leadership resulting in technological achievements and the achievement of American national security goals. He is the Endowed Faculty Chair in aerospace engineering department within the College of Engineering at Iowa State University. The first endowed "Vance D. Coffman Faculty Chair" in the aerospace engineering department at ISU was Dr. Bong Wie in 2007.

Coffman received an honorary doctorate of law degree in 2000 from the George L. Graziadio School of Business and Management at Pepperdine University. And an Honorary Doctor of Aerospace Engineering from Embry–Riddle Aeronautical University.

Business positions
Preceded by Norman R. Augustine	Chairman and chief executive officer of Lockheed Martin; 1997-2004	Succeeded by Robert J. Stevens
