= Robert J. Stevens =

American businessman

- Born: 1951 (age 74–75); McKeesport, Pennsylvania, U.S.
- Education: Slippery Rock University; New York University (MS); Columbia University (MBA)
- Occupations: Retired chairman, president and chief executive officer of Lockheed Martin

Robert J. Stevens (born 1951), is a retired executive chairman of Lockheed Martin. He was the chairman, president and chief executive officer (CEO) of Lockheed Martin from 2004 until 2013, when Marillyn Hewson became CEO and president.

== Early life and education ==
Stevens was born in McKeesport, Pennsylvania, in 1951. He attended and graduated summa cum laude from Slippery Rock University, and was later awarded the university's distinguished alumni award. He earned a Master of Science degree in engineering and management from the Tandon School of Engineering at New York University and, with a Fairchild Fellowship, an MBA from Columbia Business School in 1987. He is a graduate of the Department of Defense Systems Management College Program Management course and also served in the United States Marine Corps.

== Career ==
On August 5, 2004, Stevens was elected chief executive officer of Lockheed Martin by its board of directors, succeeding Vance D. Coffman. He was elected chairman on April 28, 2005, retaining his previous responsibilities as president and CEO. Over the course of his tenure at Lockheed, Stevens held a variety of executive positions, including chief operating officer, chief financial officer, and head of strategic planning. On April 26, 2012, it was announced that he would be retiring in December 2012 with then president and COO Chris Kubasik being promoted to CEO effective January 1, 2013. However, in November 2012, an ethics violation forced Chris Kubasik to resign, effectively making Marillyn Hewson (then Executive Vice President, Electronic Systems) the new president and COO immediately, with her taking the helm as CEO in January 2013. Stevens was elected to remain as executive chairman through 2013.

In January 2012, he was appointed by President Barack Obama to the Advisory Committee for Trade Policy and Negotiations and was chairman of the Director of National Intelligence Senior Advisory Group.

During 2001 and 2002, Stevens served on President Bush’s Commission on the Future of the United States Aerospace Industry. From 2002 to 2018, Stevens served as the lead director of the Monsanto Company and from 2015 to 2018 as a member of the board of directors of the United States Steel Corporation. He formerly served as a director for other foundations including the Congressional Medal of Honor Foundation, the Marine Corps Scholarship Foundation, and the Atlantic Council. As of 2019, he serves on the board of directors for T. Rowe Price. He is a Fellow of the American Astronautical Society, the American Institute of Aeronautics and Astronautics, the Royal Aeronautical Society, and the International Academy of Astronautics, and he is a member of the Council on Foreign Relations.

== Awards ==
He has been recognized by the National Management Association as Executive of the Year, by Government Computer News as the Industry Executive of the Year, by the Partnership for Public Service with the Private Sector Council Leadership Award, and by the Marine Corps Scholarship Foundation with the Globe and Anchor Award. In 2009, Stevens was considered one of "The TopGun CEOs" by Brendan Wood International, an advisory agency.

In 2010, he received the Marine Corps Heritage Foundation’s inaugural LeJeune Recognition for Exemplary Leadership, and in 2011 he was recognized by the National Defense Industrial Association with the James Forrestal Industry Leadership Award and inducted into the Washington Business Hall of Fame. In May 2012, Stevens was recognized by the American Institute of Aeronautics and Astronautics with its highest honor, Honorary Fellow. In October 2012, he was presented the Hispanic Engineer National Achievement Awards Chairman’s Award, and in December 2012, Stevens became the 65th recipient of the National Aeronautic Association Wright Brothers Memorial Trophy, which is presented annually for “significant public service of enduring value to aviation in the United States.” In March 2013, he received the Congressional Medal of Honor Foundation’s highest award, the Circle of Honor Award, and the Marine Corps Scholarship Foundation’s Semper Fidelis Award, and in September 2014, he was awarded the Lone Sailor Award by the U.S. Navy Memorial Foundation.

Business positions
Preceded by Vance D. Coffman	Chairman, President and Chief Executive Officer of Lockheed Martin; 2004-2013	Succeeded by Marillyn A. Hewson
