= AN/UYA-4 =

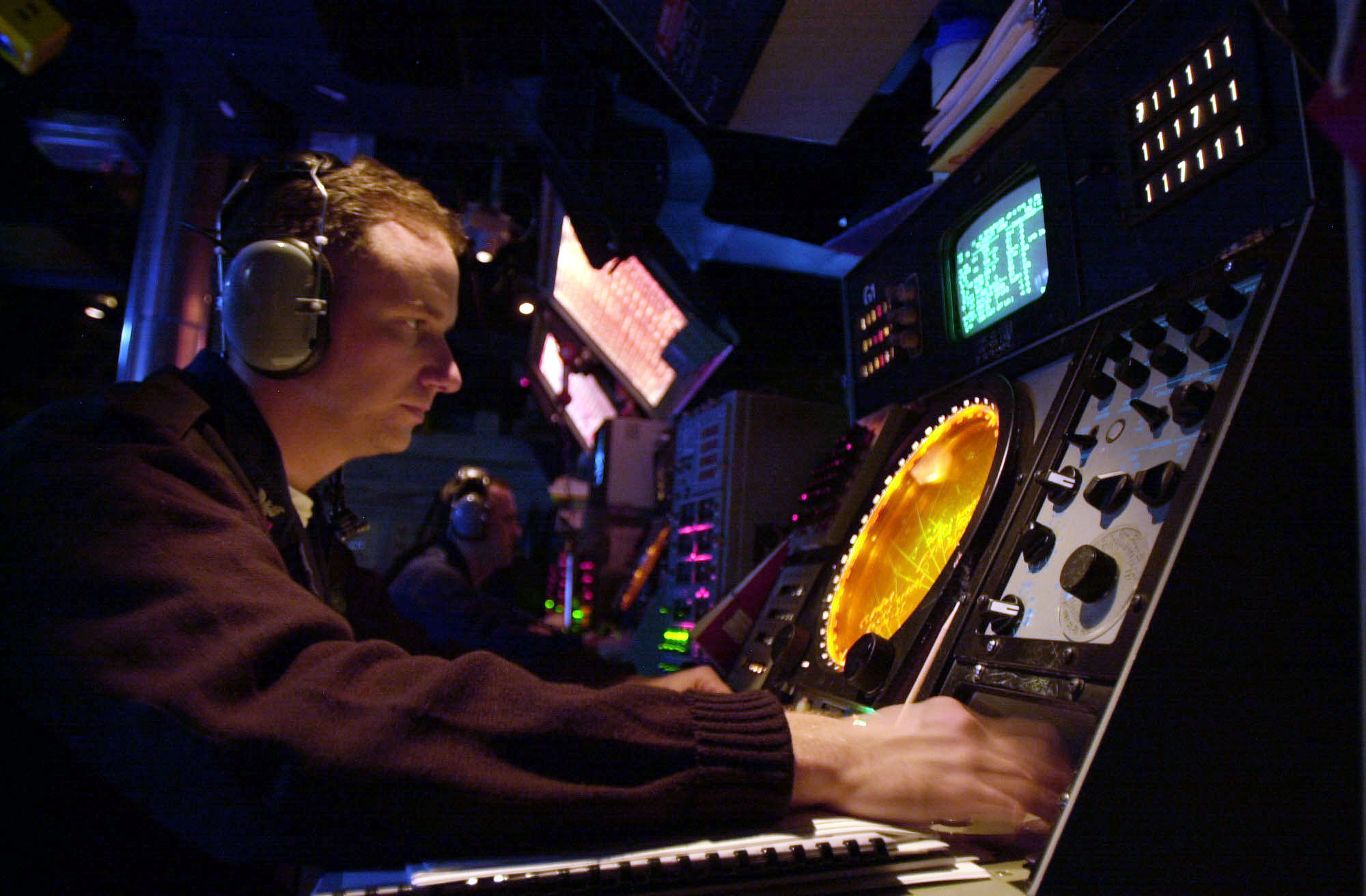
OJ-194/UYA-4

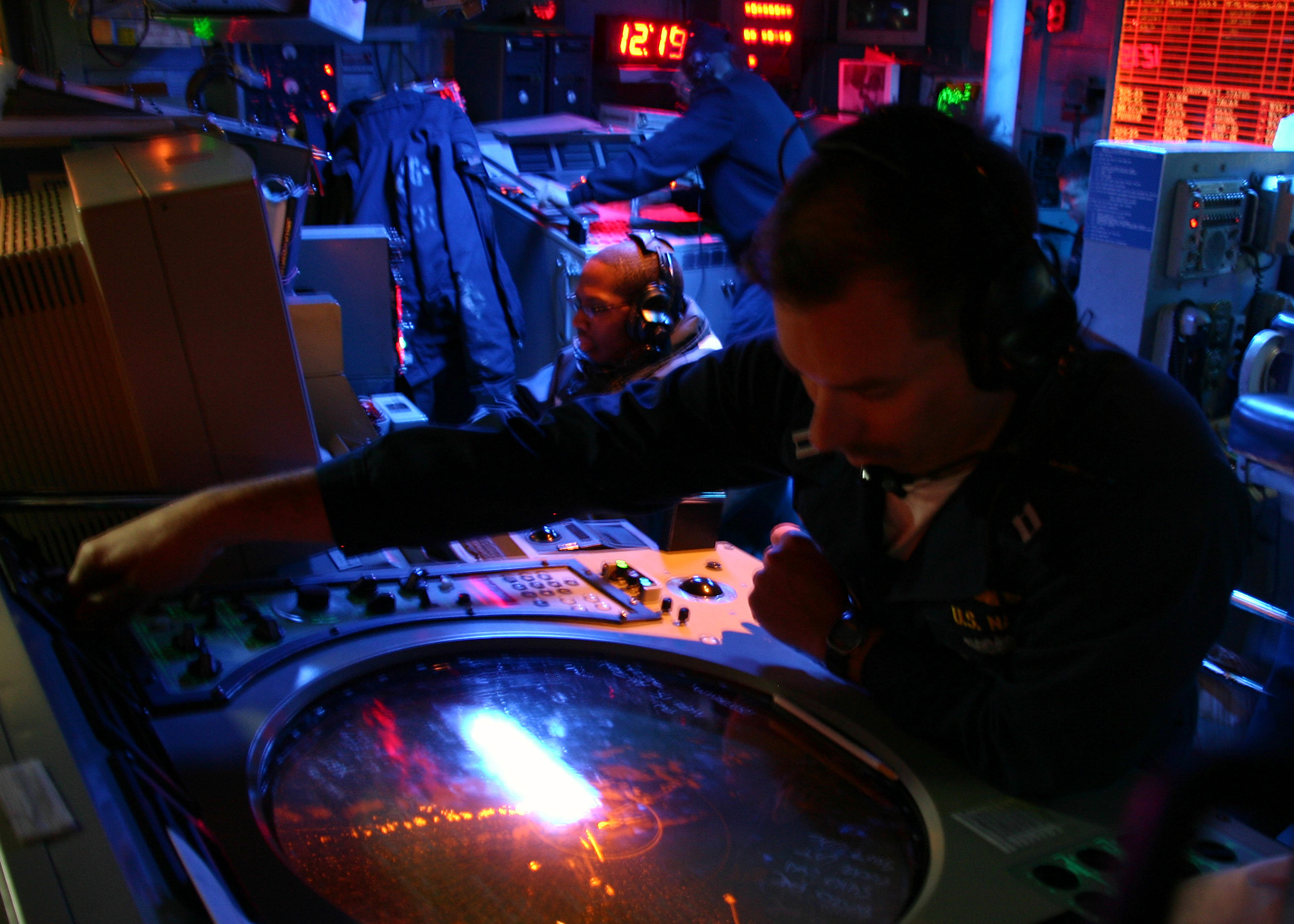
OJ-197/UYA-4

The AN/UYA-4 is a series of system consoles developed by Hughes Aircraft Company for the United States Navy.

In accordance with the Joint Electronics Type Designation System (JETDS), the "AN/UYA-4" designation represents the 4th design of an Army-Navy electronic device for general utility computer auxiliary assembly. The JETDS system also now is used to name all Department of Defense electronic systems.

== Description ==
The Naval Tactical Data System (NTDS) was originally developed to organize anti-aircraft warfare, but in the mid-1960s, it began to be considered for use in anti-submarine warfare (ASW) as well, and the ASWSC&CS (ASW Ship Command and Control System) project was initiated. As part of this project, a console with greater versatility than the SYA-4 used by the early NTDS was required. The UYA-4 was developed in response and was designed around 1965.

The UYA-4 series was the first NTDS display subsystem to employ electronic circuits as integrated circuits instead of individual components such as transistors, resistors, and diodes. The basic model is the OJ-194/UYA-4, which has a 12-inch plan position indicator, six buttons with fixed functions, and 18 variable-action buttons (VABs), allowing switching between 45 operational modes.

This series also included table type consoles (operations summary console, OSC) with a large 20-inch PPI scope arranged horizontally so that the screen could be viewed from three sides: initially the OA-7981 and later the OJ-195 and 197 were used.

In addition, the OA-7980 was also included to process information about the altitude of targets by obtaining information from 3D radar and other sources.

However, the functions of this series were basically limited to operation and display, and information processing was performed by mainframe computers such as the CP-642 and AN/UYK-7. The OJ-197/UYA-4 in particular was expensive to maintain and manage, and was gradually replaced in succeeding systems by the AN/UYQ-70, capable of processing information on its own.

== See also ==
- List of military electronics of the United States
