= Lockheed Martin Rotary and Mission Systems =

Lockheed Martin business segment

Lockheed Martin Rotary and Mission Systems (LM RMS) is a Lockheed Martin business segment headquartered in Washington, D.C. Until October 2008, RMS was headquartered in Moorestown Township, New Jersey, a suburb of Philadelphia; Moorestown remains one of the largest sites in the business unit and is where many of the unit's top executives have their offices.

As of 2013, RMS is one of Lockheed Martin's five operating units; prior to that it was a part of the now-defunct Electronic Systems sector. RMS was formerly known as Mission Systems and Sensors (LM MS2), and then as Mission Systems & Training (LM MST). MST was composed of several other Lockheed Martin business areas and operating groups, including Maritime Systems and Sensors (MS2) / Naval Electronics and Surveillance Systems (NESS) and Lockheed Martin Systems Integration. Stephanie Hill is the current executive vice president of RMS.

In 2015, Lockheed Martin acquired Sikorsky Aircraft Corporation. SAC became a line of business within RMS.

Current major products of RMS include:

- the Aegis combat system
- the Mk41 Vertical Launching System
- the Desert Hawk UAV
- the AN/UYQ-70 display system
- the AN/UYK-43 and AN/UYK-44 computers
- AN/SPY-1 naval RADAR systems
- AN/SQQ-89 SONAR system
- P-3 Orion mission systems and
- tactical avionics for the F-35 Lightning II and
- the F-16 Fighting Falcon

Products in development include:

- the Space Fence radar
- Integrated Deepwater System Program, in partnership with Northrop Grumman
- Medium Extended Air Defense System
- the Littoral Combat Ship.

== Business lines ==
When the segment was renamed RMS in September 2016, it had the following five lines of business:

- C4ISR & Undersea Systems
- Integrated Warfare Systems & Sensors (IWSS)
- Ship & Aviation Systems (SAS)
- Sikorsky, a Lockheed Martin Company
- Training and Logistics Solutions (TLS)

== Locations ==
RMS has approximately 35,000 employees located at numerous sites around the United States and abroad (mostly Canada and Australia). Sites with more than 500 employees, in order of size, are:

- Moorestown Township/Mt. Laurel Township, NJ
- Owego, NY (merged with MS2 in 2010; formerly known as Systems Integration)
- Orlando, FL
- Syracuse, NY
- Manassas, VA
- Baltimore, MD
- Akron, OH
- Clearwater, FL
- Coatesville, PA
- San Diego, CA
- Milwaukee, WI
- Stratford, CT (Sikorsky headquarters)

Lockheed Martin Canada and Lockheed Martin Australia operations also fall under the RMS business.
