= Amor Group =

Amor Group Business Technology Solutions
- Headquarters: Glasgow, Scotland
- Number of locations: Aberdeen, Coventry, Edinburgh, Houston
- Revenue: £33.89 million (2011)
- Owner: Lockheed Martin
- Number of employees: 500 (2013)
- Divisions: Public Sector, Energy, Transport
- Website: www.amorgroup.com

Amor Group was Scotland's largest independent business technology company, specializing in energy, transport and public sector health, before being acquired by Lockheed Martin in September 2013. The business was formed after a £28 million management buyout of Glasgow based Real Time Engineering Ltd. and Aberdeen based Pragma, which were under the ownership of the French global IT firm Sword Business Technology Solutions Ltd. The buyout attracted a Scottish business award for the 'deal of the year'.

== History ==
In May 2009, Capital Growth Partners (CGP) made and "investment partnership" with Amor Group. CGP exited their investment into Amor Group in September 2013.

In November 2010, the group purchased global managed services provider DW Technology Services Ltd and inherited its 25 employees.

In 2011, the group purchased aerospace software business FS Walker Hughes, incorporating its Chroma Suite products into the group's own Airport product offerings.

In October 2011, the group purchased London healthcare IT firm, Invisys.

The group was headquartered in the former industrial tyre building of India of Inchinnan in Renfrewshire, although this was referred to by the company as the 'Glasgow Headquarters' on their corporate website. Other offices are based in Aberdeen, Daresbury, Dubai, Edinburgh, Coventry and Houston, Texas.

Amor Group operated in the Public, Energy and Transport sectors with clients including the National Health Service (NHS), Scottish Charity Regulator (OSCR), Centrica, and Oslo Airport. The group is a gold certified Microsoft partner.

Amor Group was a portfolio company of Growth Capital Partners.

Amor Group was purchased by the defence giant Lockheed Martin in September 2013 for an undisclosed amount.
