= DreamHammer =

American software company

- Type: Private
- Industry: Enterprise Software
- Founded: 2011
- Headquarters: San Diego, California, U.S. (formerly Santa Monica, California, U.S.)
- Website: DreamHammer.com

DreamHammer is a San Diego–based software company that provides advanced drone management software for enterprise customers.

== History ==
Its first product, Ballista, is an OS for drones and allows one person to simultaneously control multiple drones of any type. It features a plug and play architecture that can be integrated into any unmanned system. Ballista has been licensed to government agencies, including the U.S. Navy's Program Executive Office (PEO) Unmanned Aviation and Strike Weapons.

On July 3, 2013, DreamHammer announced it was partnering with Lockheed Martin to use the company's software for integrated command and control of Lockheed Martin's unmanned aerial vehicles. Lockheed and the Pentagon have worked with DreamHammer to create the software which works with boats, planes or trucks. DreamHammer has spent $6.5 million to develop the software.
