= James Taiclet =

American business executive (born 1960)

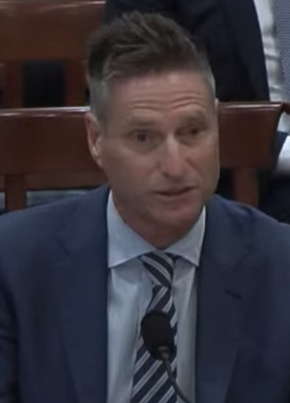
- Taiclet in 2023
- Born: James Donald Taiclet; May 13, 1960 (age 66); Pittsburgh, Pennsylvania, U.S.
- Education: United States Air Force Academy (BS); Princeton University (MPA)
- Occupation: Business executive
- Title: Chairman, President & CEO of Lockheed Martin
- Predecessor: Marillyn Hewson
- Website: Lockheed Martin Leadership

Signature
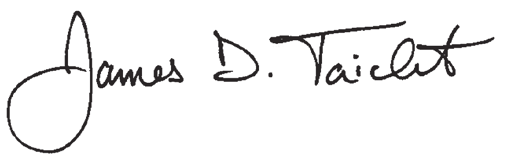

James Donald Taiclet Jr. (/teɪklɛt/; born May 13, 1960) is an American business executive who has been the president and chief executive officer (CEO) of Lockheed Martin since June 2020, and chairman since March 2021.

== Early life and education ==
James Taiclet was born in Pittsburgh, on May 13, 1960. His father, James Sr., served in the U.S. Army at the Wiesbaden Air Base in Germany, and later became a boilermaker in Pittsburgh. His mother, Mary Ann (née Foley), was a homemaker and school administrator.

Taiclet graduated from the U.S. Air Force Academy in 1982 with a degree in engineering and international relations. While at the academy, Taiclet played on the rugby team, serving as captain during his senior year.

Taiclet earned a master's degree in public affairs from Princeton University, where he was awarded a fellowship at the Princeton School of Public and International Affairs.

== Military service ==
From 1985 to 1991, Taiclet was a pilot in the United States Air Force, serving as aircraft commander, instructor pilot and unit chief of standardization and evaluation. During Operation Desert Shield, he flew multiple missions in a Lockheed C-141 Starlifter transport jet. His rotational assignments included the Joint Staff and Air Staff at the Pentagon.

== Business career ==
Taiclet first worked in the private sector as a management consultant at McKinsey & Co. from July 1991 to February 1996. He then joined Pratt & Whitney as vice president of engine services until 1999, and was then president of Honeywell Aerospace Services until 2001.

In 2001, American Tower recruited Taiclet for the role of chief operating officer. He was named chief executive officer of American Tower in October 2003 after the departure of Steven B. Dodge, and was selected as chairman in February 2004. He remained as CEO and on the board of American Tower until 2020.

In 2018, Taiclet joined the board of directors of Lockheed Martin.

In June 2020, Taiclet was named as CEO of Lockheed Martin, succeeding Marillyn Hewson. He was named chairman of the company in March 2021.

On February 16, 2023, China placed two companies, Lockheed Martin Corporation and Raytheon Missiles & Defense, on its unreliable entities list as they sold arms to Taiwan, banning them from engaging in China-related import or export activities and making new investments in China. Senior executives of the two companies, including Taiclet, have since then been prohibited from entering China, as well as working, staying and residing in China.

== Other memberships ==
Taiclet holds memberships on the boards of various non-profits and NGOs. He serves on the Council on Foreign Relations board and is co-chair of the Council's Task Force on Economic Security. He is on the board of directors for Mass General Brigham, is an associate fellow of the American Institute of Aeronautics and Astronautics and is a member of The Business Council. He has also attended the World Economic Forum.

While he was CEO of American Tower, Taiclet and his wife supported the Newton-Wellesley Hospital Charitable Foundation and the Charles River Center.

== Recognition ==
Taiclet is a two-time Wash100 recipient, earning the award in 2021 and 2022. From 2013 to 2018, Taiclet was named to Harvard Business Review's list of "Best-Performing CEOs" in the World.
