= Marillyn Hewson =

American businesswoman (born 1953)

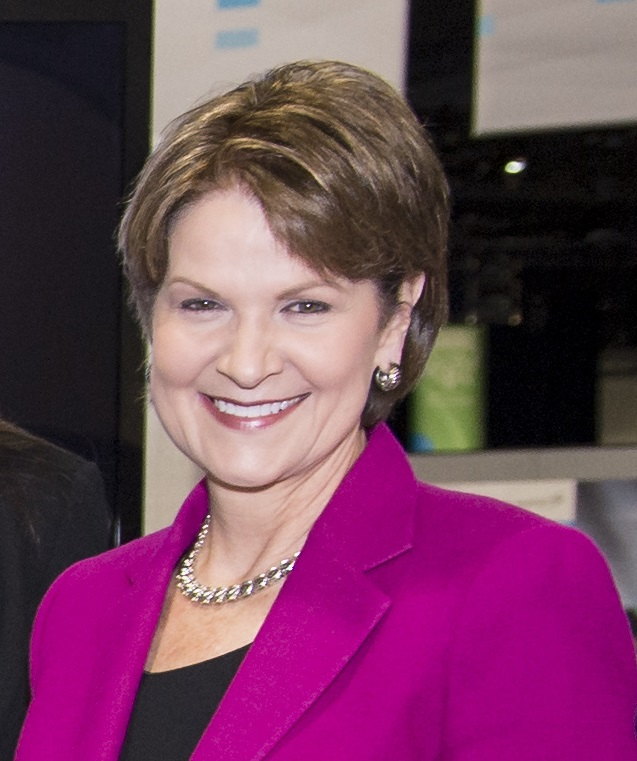
- Hewson in 2014
- Born: Marillyn Adams; December 27, 1953 (age 72); Junction City, Kansas, U.S.
- Education: University of Alabama (BS, MA)
- Occupation: Business executive
- Predecessor: Robert J. Stevens
- Successor: James D. Taiclet
- Spouse: James Hewson
- Children: 2
- Website: Marillyn A. Hewson, Executive Chairman at the Wayback Machine (archived February 13, 2021)

Signature
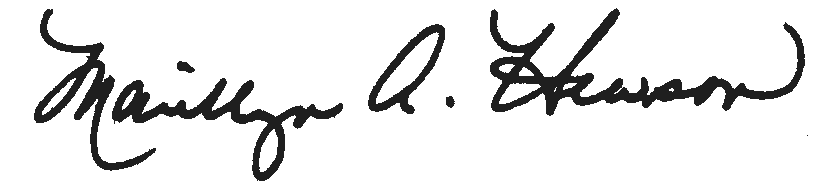

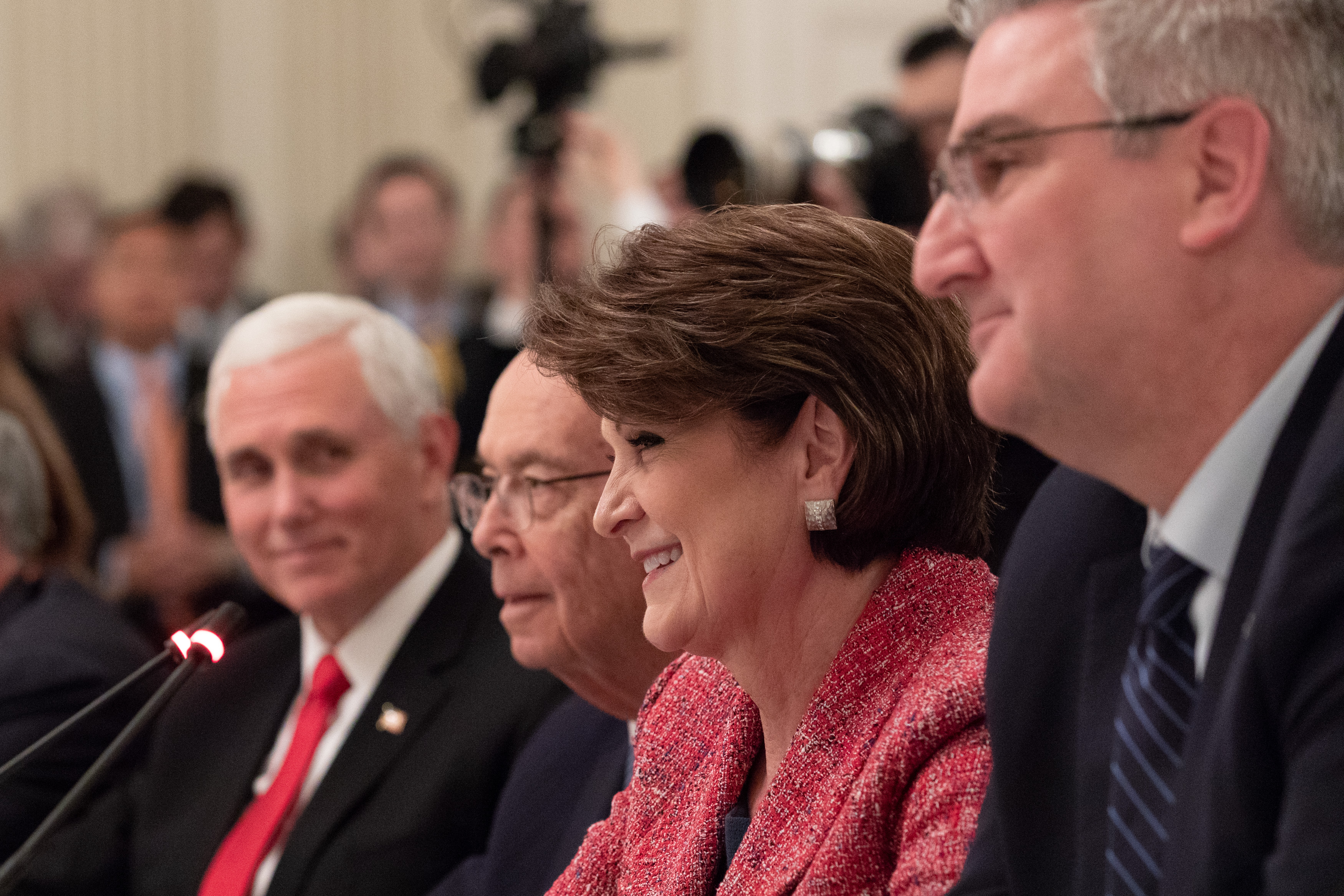
Hewson participates in a White House panel discussing workforce development on March 6, 2019

Marillyn Adams Hewson (born December 27, 1953) is an American businesswoman who served as the chairman, president and chief executive officer (CEO) of Lockheed Martin from January 2013 to June 2020.

== Biography ==
=== Early life and education ===
Hewson was born in Junction City, Kansas to Warren Adams and Mary Adams. Her father died when she was nine years old and her mother, a former WAC, raised five siblings, then aged 5 to 15. Hewson credits her mother's resilience, hard work, and determination with teaching her leadership skills and wrote, in "A mother's resilience", for Politico, in 2013, that "My mother did what all great leaders do: she sparked the growth of future leaders."

She earned her Bachelor of Science degree in business administration and her Master of Arts degree in economics from the University of Alabama. She also attended the Columbia Business School and Harvard Business School executive development programs.

=== Career ===
Hewson joined the Lockheed Corporation in 1983 after 4 years as an economist at the Bureau of Labor Statistics. She has held a variety of executive positions with the company, including President and Chief Operating Officer, Executive Vice President of Lockheed Martin's Electronic Systems business area, President of Lockheed Martin Systems Integration, Executive Vice President of Global Sustainment for Lockheed Martin Aeronautics, President and General Manager of Kelly Aviation Center, L.P., and President of Lockheed Martin Logistics Services. On November 9, 2012, she was elected to Lockheed Martin's board of directors. She subsequently served as CEO from January 2013 until June 2020. She has also served on the board of directors for Sandia National Laboratories since 2010 and DuPont since 2007.

In July 2015, Hewson announced Lockheed's purchase of Sikorsky Aircraft, the producers of Sikorsky UH-60 Black Hawk helicopters, giving Lockheed its own helicopter building capability. Hewson also shifted more company efforts towards building military hardware. Hewson joined the board of Johnson & Johnson in 2019.

On March 16, 2020, Lockheed announced that Hewson would become the executive chair of the board and be replaced as CEO on June 15. James Taiclet was named as her successor.

Hewson retired as executive chairman and board member in March 2021.

=== Recognition ===
In 2010, 2011, 2012, and 2015 she was named by Fortune magazine as one of the "50 Most Powerful Women in Business". In the September 15, 2015, issue of Fortune, Hewson was ranked 4th. In 2018, Hewson was named the most powerful woman in the business world by Fortune.

Hewson was named the 21st most powerful woman in the world by Forbes in 2014, and, in 2015, as the 20th most powerful woman in the world. In 2018, she was named the ninth most powerful woman in the world by Forbes. In 2019 she was listed as number 10.

Hewson was inducted into the 2017 edition of the Wash100 for international market focus and F-35 leadership.

In 2017, Hewson was listed at #35 on the Harvard Business Review "The Best-Performing CEOs in the World 2017" list.

Hewson was named "CEO of the Year" for 2018 by Chief Executive magazine, and was a member of the selection committee for 2019.

In 2018, Hewson was also awarded the Edison Achievement Award for her leadership and achievements in making a lasting contribution to the world of innovation.

Hewson was named one of Time magazine's 100 Most Influential People of 2019.

In 2019, Hewson received the Golden Plate Award of the American Academy of Achievement presented by General Joseph Ralston, USAF, former Supreme Allied Commander Europe.

Hewson was honored with the Aviation Week & Space Technology 2021 Philip J. Klass Award for Lifetime Achievement.

In 2025, Hewson was elected to the National Academy of Engineering.

=== Personal ===
Hewson is married to James R. Hewson and lives in McLean, Virginia, as of 2020. The couple met as students at the University of Alabama. They have two sons.

Business positions
New creation	Executive Chairman of Lockheed Martin; 2020-present	Incumbent
Preceded by Robert J. Stevens	Chairman, President, and Chief Executive Officer of Lockheed Martin; 2013-2020	Succeeded by James D. Taiclet as President and CEO
