= Lockheed Martin =

American aerospace, defense, security, and technology company

Lockheed Martin Corporation

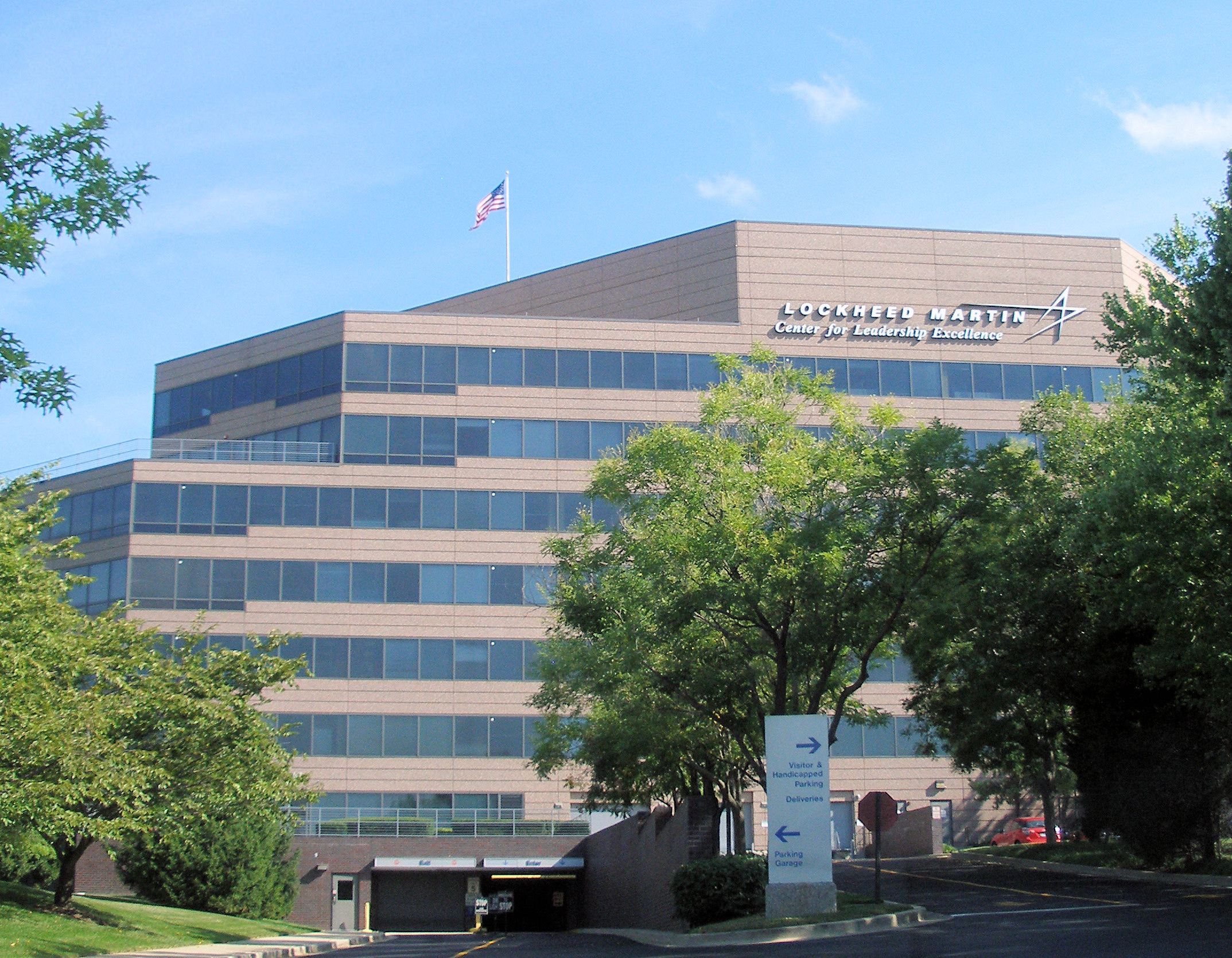
- Lockheed Martin headquarters in North Bethesda, Maryland
- Type: Public
- Traded as: NYSE: LMT; S&P 100 component; S&P 500 component
- Industry: Aerospace; Defense
- Predecessors: Lockheed Corporation; Martin Marietta
- Founded: March 15, 1995; 31 years ago
- Headquarters: Bethesda, Maryland, United States
- Area served: Worldwide
- Key people: James Taiclet (chair, president & CEO); Frank St. John (COO); Evan Scott (CFO)
- Revenue: ▲US$75.05 billion (2025)
- Operating income: ▲US$7.731 billion (2025)
- Net income: ▼US$5.017 billion (2025)
- Total assets: ▲US$59.84 billion (2025)
- Total equity: ▲US$6.721 billion (2025)
- Number of employees: 123,000 (2025)
- Divisions: Aeronautics; Missiles and Fire Control; Rotary and Mission Systems; Space
- Subsidiaries: Sikorsky Aircraft
- Website: lockheedmartin.com

The Lockheed Martin Corporation is an American defense and aerospace manufacturer. It is headquartered in North Bethesda, Maryland, United States. The company was formed by the merger of the Lockheed Corporation with Martin Marietta on March 15, 1995.

Lockheed Martin operates 4 divisions: Lockheed Martin Aeronautics (39% of 2024 revenues); Lockheed Martin Missiles and Fire Control (18% of 2024 revenues); Lockheed Martin Rotary and Mission Systems (24% of 2024 revenues); and Lockheed Martin Space (18% of 2024 revenues).

As of 2023, it is the top contractor of the United States federal government, and has been since at least 2008. As of 2024, 73% of the company's revenue came from the federal government, including 65% from the United States Department of Defense. In 2024, 26% of revenue was from sales of the F-35 fighter.

Lockheed Martin is also a contractor for the U.S. Department of Energy and the National Aeronautics and Space Administration (NASA). It also provides products and services to the Department of Defense and the Department of Energy to the Department of Agriculture and the Environmental Protection Agency. It is involved in surveillance and information processing for the CIA, the FBI, the Internal Revenue Service (IRS), the National Security Agency (NSA), the Pentagon, the Census Bureau, and the Postal Service.

The company has received the Collier Trophy six times, including in 2001 for being part of developing the X-35/F-35B LiftFan Propulsion System and in 2018 for the Automatic Ground Collision Avoidance System (Auto-GCAS). Lockheed Martin currently produces the F-35 and leads the international supply chain, leads the team for the development and implementation of technology solutions for the new USAF Space Fence (AFSSS replacement), and is the primary contractor for the development of the Orion command module. The company also invests in healthcare systems, renewable energy systems, intelligent energy distribution, and compact nuclear fusion.

The company also manufactures the MIM-104 Patriot air-defense system and its PAC-3 MSE interceptor. In 2026, Lockheed Martin announced plans to increase PAC-3 MSE production to 2,000 interceptors annually by the end of the decade, expanding production capacity in response to increased demand and the need to replenish U.S. and allied inventories.

== History ==
=== 1990s ===
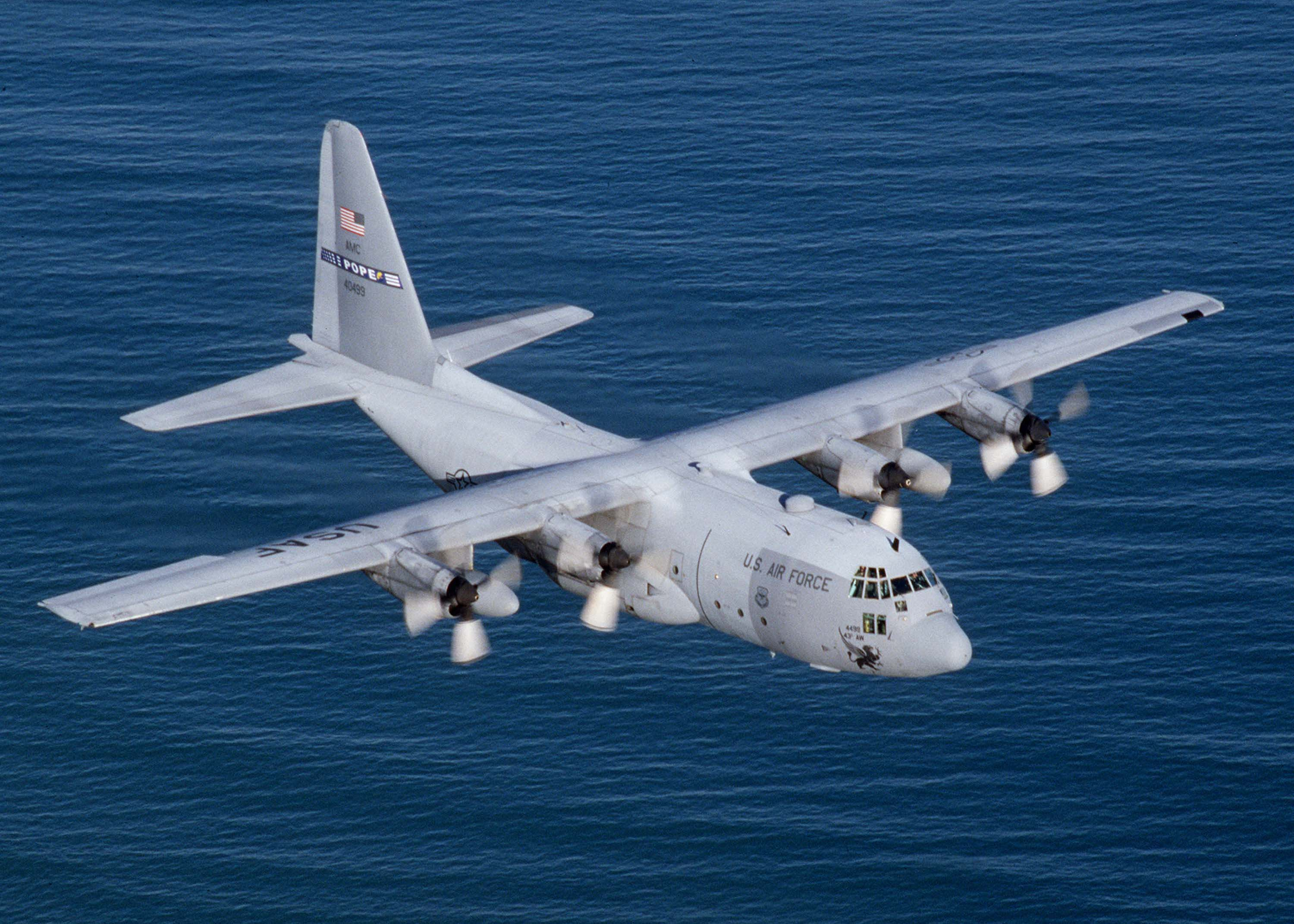
The C-130 Hercules has been in production since the 1950s with the C-130J variant being produced now.

Merger talks between Lockheed Corporation and Martin Marietta began in March 1994, with the companies announcing their $10 billion planned merger on August 30, 1994. The headquarters for the combined companies would be at Martin Marietta headquarters in North Bethesda, Maryland. The deal was finalized on March 15, 1995, when the two companies' shareholders approved the merger. The segments of the two companies not retained by the new company formed the basis for L-3 Communications, a mid-size defense contractor in its own right. Lockheed Martin also later spun off the materials company Martin Marietta Materials.

The company's executives received large bonuses directly from the government as a result of the merger. Norman R. Augustine, who was at the time CEO of Martin Marietta, received an $8.2 million bonus.

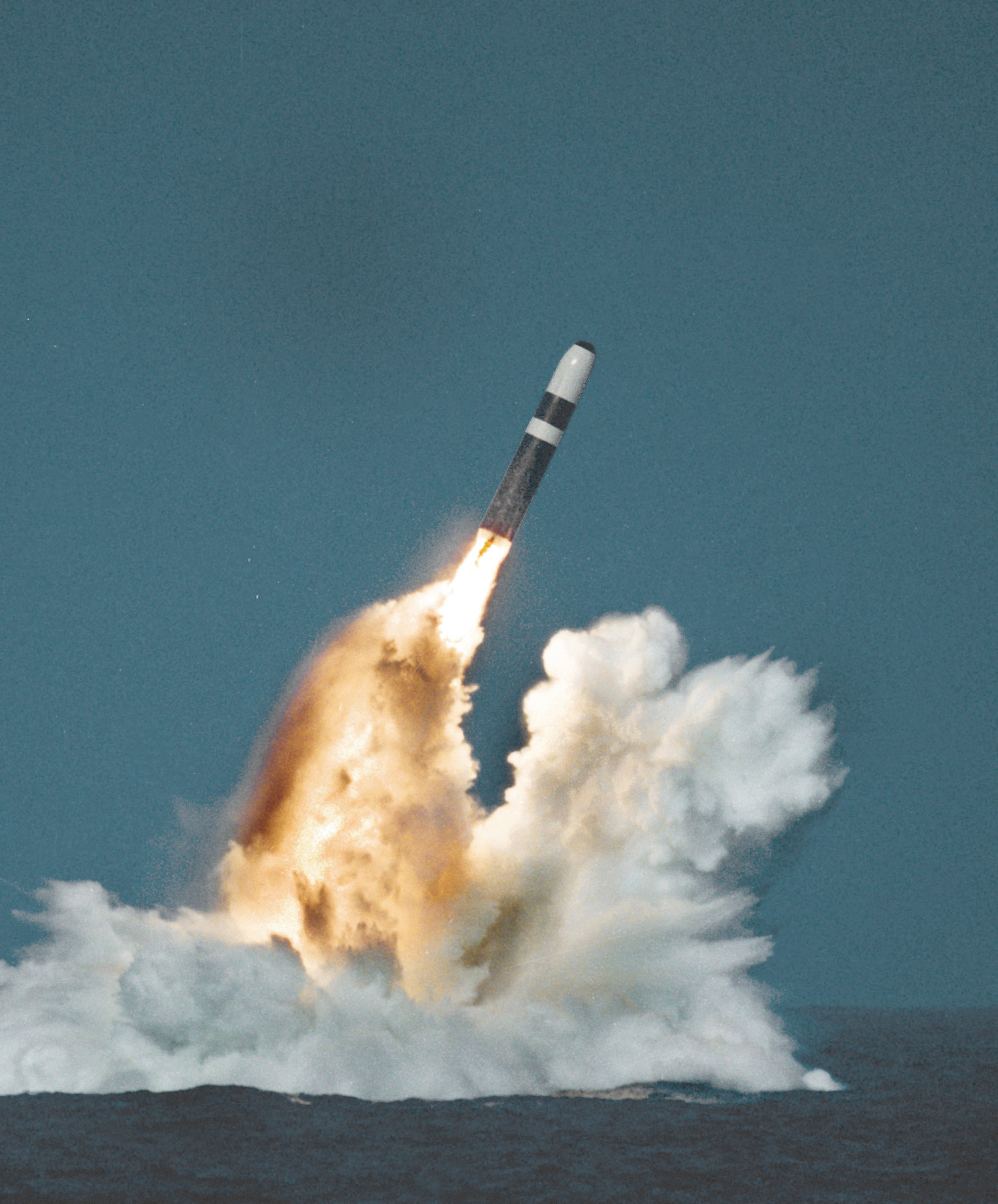
Submarine launch of a Lockheed UGM-133 Trident II SLBM

Both companies contributed important products to the new portfolio. Lockheed products included the Trident missile, P-3 Orion maritime patrol aircraft, U-2 and SR-71 Blackbird reconnaissance airplanes, F-117 Nighthawk, F-16 Fighting Falcon, F-22 Raptor, C-130 Hercules, A-4AR Fightinghawk and the DSCS-3 satellite. Martin Marietta products included Titan rockets, Sandia National Laboratories (management contract acquired in 1993), Space Shuttle External Tank, Viking 1 and Viking 2 landers, the Transfer Orbit Stage (under subcontract to Orbital Sciences Corporation) and various satellite models.

On April 22, 1996, Lockheed Martin completed the acquisition of Loral Corporation's defense electronics and system integration businesses for $9.1 billion, the deal having been announced in January. The remainder of Loral became Loral Space & Communications. Lockheed Martin abandoned plans for an $8.3 billion merger with Northrop Grumman on July 16, 1998, due to government concerns over the potential strength of the new group; Lockheed/Northrop would have had control of 25% of the Department of Defense's procurement budget.

For the Mars Climate Orbiter, Lockheed Martin incorrectly provided NASA with software using measurements in US Customary force units when metric units were expected; this resulted in the loss of the Orbiter at a cost of $125 million. The development of the spacecraft cost $193 million.

In addition to their military products, in the 1990s Lockheed Martin developed the texture mapping chip for the Sega Model 2 arcade system board and the entire graphics system for the Sega Model 3, which were used to power some of the most popular arcade games of the time.

=== 2000s ===
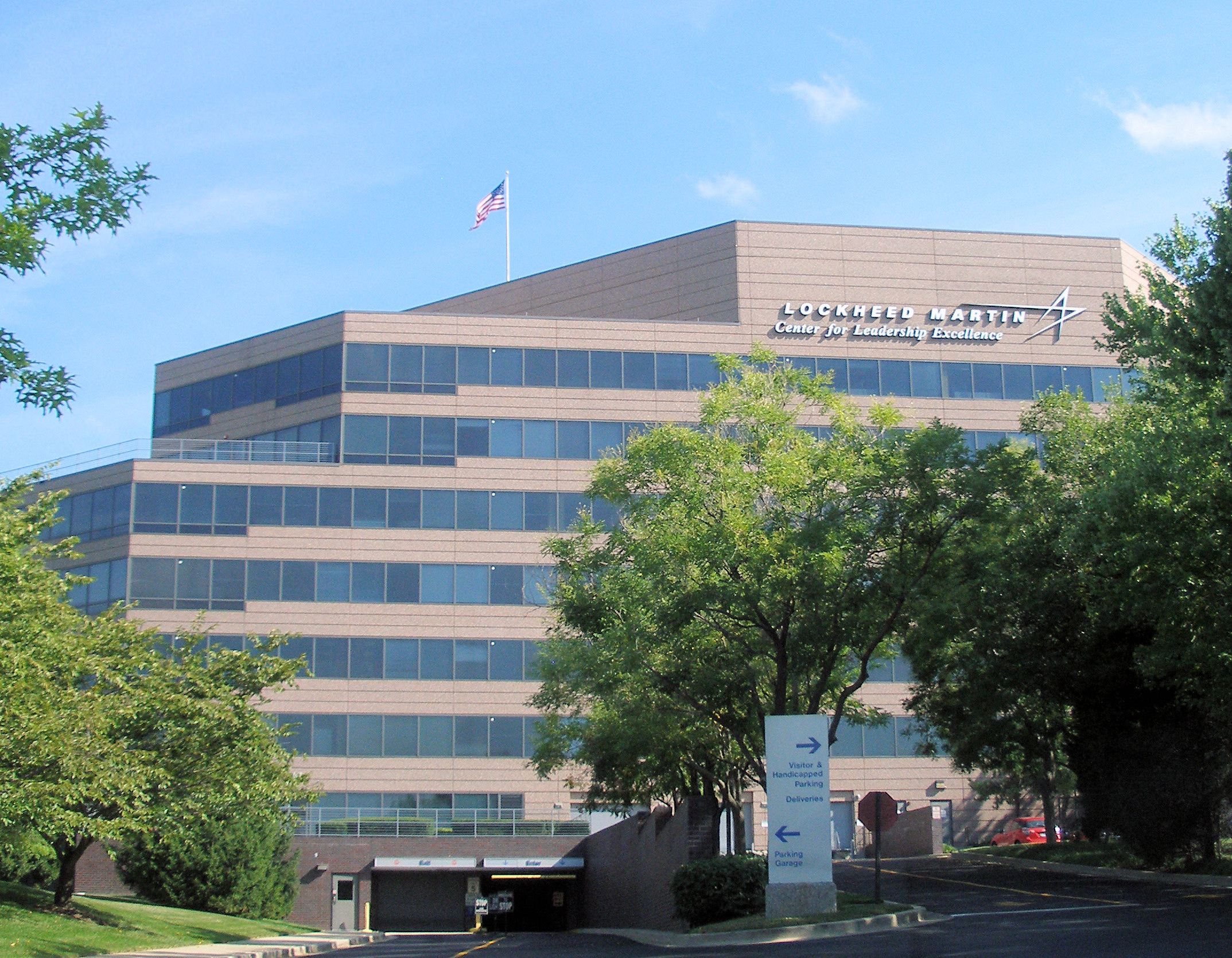
Lockheed Martin's prior Center For Leadership Excellence (CLE) Building, which was located near its corporate headquarters

In May 2001, Lockheed Martin sold Lockheed Martin Control Systems to BAE Systems. On November 27, 2000, Lockheed completed the sale of its Aerospace Electronic Systems business to BAE Systems for $1.67 billion, a deal announced in July 2000. This group encompassed Sanders Associates, Fairchild Systems, and Lockheed Martin Space Electronics & Communications. In 2001, Lockheed Martin won the contract to build the F-35 Lightning II; this was the largest fighter aircraft procurement project since the F-16, with an initial order of 3,000 aircraft. In 2001, Lockheed Martin settled a nine–year investigation conducted by NASA's Office of Inspector General with the assistance of the Defense Contract Audit Agency. The company paid the United States government $7.1 million based on allegations that its predecessor, Lockheed Engineering Science Corporation, submitted false lease costs claims to NASA.

On July 8, 2003, a Lockheed Martin plant in Meridian, Mississippi became the scene of a racially motivated mass shooting when an assembly line worker murdered six co-workers (five of whom were black) and wounded eight before killing himself. In the immediate aftermath of the shooting, Lockheed Martin's President refused to disclose whether company officials were previously aware of any red flags regarding the worker. The company had launched its own investigation into the worker's behavior prior to the massacre following complaints from numerous black employees regarding incidents involving the worker. He had been ordered to attend anger management courses and diversity training but refused.

On May 12, 2006, The Washington Post reported that when Robert Stevens took control of Lockheed Martin in 2004, he faced the dilemma that within 10 years, 100,000 of the about 130,000 Lockheed Martin employees – more than three-quarters – would be retiring. On August 31, 2006, Lockheed Martin won a $3.9 billion contract from NASA to design and build the CEV capsule, later named Orion for the Ares I rocket in the Constellation Program. In 2009, NASA reduced the capsule crew requirements from the initial six seats to four for transport to the International Space Station.

In August 2007, Lockheed Martin acquired 3Dsolve, a Cary, North Carolina, company that created simulations and training modules for the military and corporate clients. Renamed Lockheed Martin 3D Learning Systems, the company remained in Cary with 3D's founder Richard Boyd as director. The name was eventually shortened to Lockheed Martin 3D Solutions.

On August 13, 2008, Lockheed Martin acquired the government business unit of Nantero, Inc., a company that had developed methods and processes for incorporating carbon nanotubes in next-generation electronic devices. In 2009, Lockheed Martin bought Unitech.

=== 2010s ===
Lockheed Martin logo (2011–2022)

On November 18, 2010, Lockheed Martin announced that it would be closing its Eagan, Minnesota, location by 2013 to reduce costs and optimize capacity at its locations nationwide. In January 2011, Lockheed Martin agreed to pay the U.S. Government $2 million to settle allegations that the company submitted false claims on a U.S. government contract for that amount. The allegations came from a contract with the Naval Oceanographic Office Major Shared Resource Center in Mississippi.

On May 25, 2011, Lockheed Martin bought the first Quantum Computing System from D-Wave Systems. Lockheed Martin and D-Wave will collaborate to realize the benefits of a computing platform based upon a quantum annealing processor, as applied to some of Lockheed Martin's most challenging computation problems. Lockheed Martin established a multi-year contract that includes one system, maintenance, and services.

On May 28, 2011, it was reported that a cyberattack using previously stolen EMC files had broken through to sensitive materials at the contractor. It is unclear if the Lockheed incident is the specific prompt whereby on June 1, 2011, the new United States military strategy, makes explicit that a cyberattack is casus belli for a traditional act of war.

On March 3, 2012, the U.S. Department of Justice (DOJ) said that Lockheed Martin had agreed to settle allegations that the defense contractor had sold overpriced perishable tools used on many contracts. The DOJ said the allegations were based specifically on the subsidiary Tools & Metals Inc's inflation of costs between 1998 and 2005, which Lockheed Martin then passed on to the U.S. government under its contracts. Further, in March 2006, Todd B. Loftis, a former TMI president, was sentenced to 87 months in prison and ordered to pay a fine of $20 million following his guilty plea.

On July 10, 2012, Lockheed Martin announced it was cutting its workforce by 740 workers to reduce costs and remain competitive as necessary for future growth. On November 27, 2012, Lockheed Martin announced that Marillyn Hewson would become the corporation's chief executive officer on January 1, 2013.

On January 7, 2013, Lockheed Martin Canada announced that it would be acquiring the engine maintenance, repair, and overhaul assets from Aveos Fleet Performance in Montreal, Quebec, Canada. On February 20, 2013, Lockheed Martin Corp complied with the United States District Court for the Southern District of New York, agreeing to pay a $19.5 million lawsuit to conclude a securities fraud class-action legal battle that had accused the company of deceiving shareholders in regards to expectations for the company's information technology division. On July 3, 2013, Lockheed Martin announced that it was partnering with DreamHammer to use the company's software for integrated command and control of its unmanned aerial vehicles. Lockheed Martin teamed up with Bell Helicopter to propose the V-280 Valor tiltrotor for the Future Vertical Lift (FVL) program. In September 2013, Lockheed Martin acquired the Scotland-based tech firm, Amor Group, saying the deal would aid its plans to expand internationally and into non-defense markets. On November 14, 2013, Lockheed announced they would be closing their Akron, Ohio facility laying off 500 employees and transferring other employees to other locations.

In October 2013, Lockheed announced it expected to finalize a $2.2 billion contract with the United States Air Force for two advanced military communications satellites.

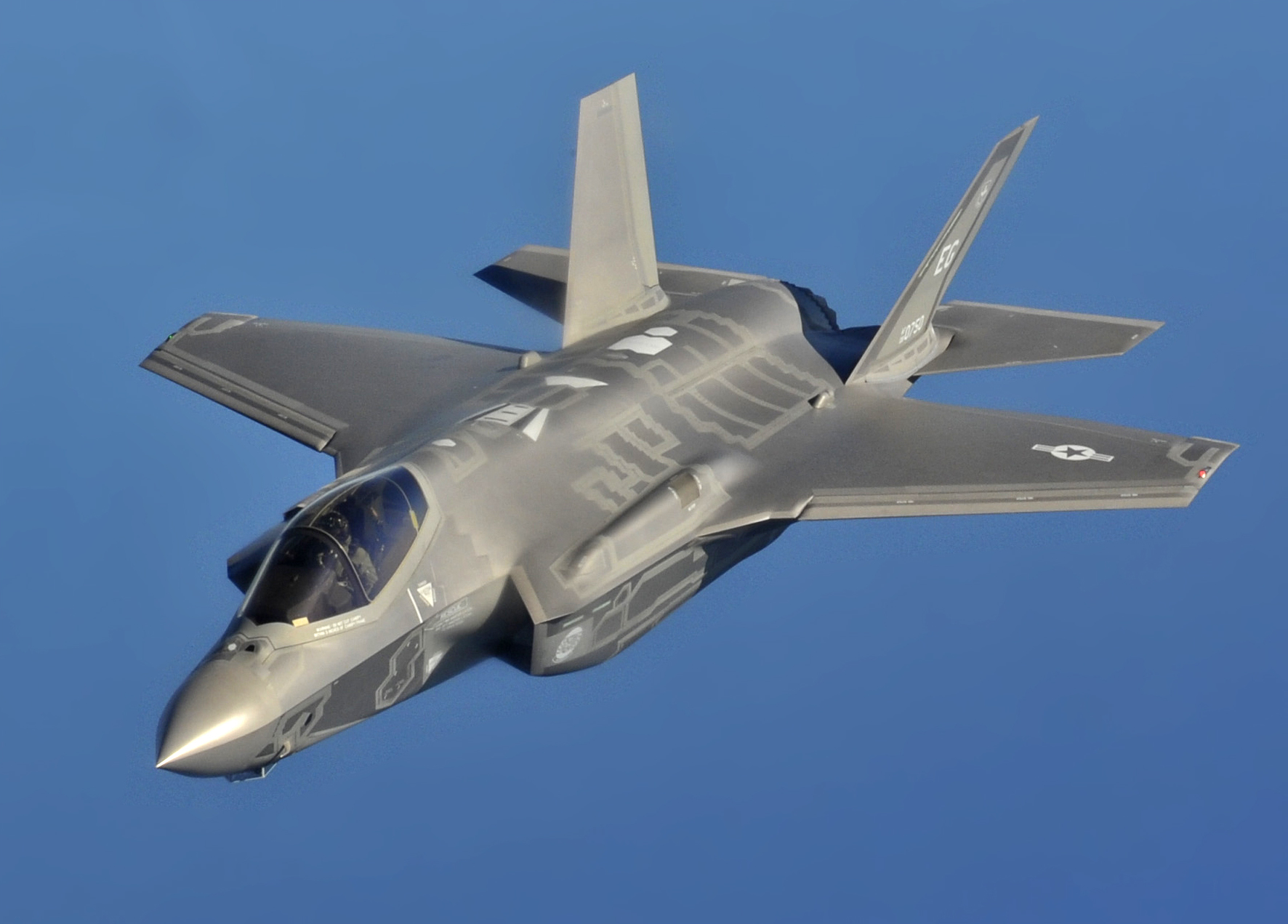
Lockheed Martin's F-35 Lightning II

In March 2014, Lockheed Martin acquired Beontra AG, a provider of integrated planning and demand forecasting tools for airport, planning to expand their business in commercial airport information technology solutions. Also, in March 2014, Lockheed Martin announced its acquisition of Industrial Defender Inc. On June 2, 2014, Lockheed Martin received a Pentagon contract to build a space fence that would track debris, keeping it from damaging satellites and spacecraft.

On December 20, 2014, Lockheed Martin Integrated Systems agreed to settle a False Claims Act lawsuit paying $27.5 million to finalize allegations that it had knowingly overbilled taxpayers for work performed by company staff who did not hold the relevant essential qualifications for the contract.

On July 20, 2015, Lockheed Martin announced plans to purchase Sikorsky Aircraft from United Technologies Corporation at a cost of $7.1 billion. The Pentagon has criticized the acquisition as causing a reduction in competition. In November 2015, the acquisition received final approval from the Chinese government, with a total cost of $9 billion. Dan Schulz was named the president of Lockheed Martin's Sikorsky company. Lockheed Martin has shown sketches for a twin-engine, blended wing body strategic airlifter similar in size to the C-5. On March 31, 2015, the US Navy awarded Lockheed Martin a contract worth $362 million for the construction of Freedom-class ship LCS 21 and $79 million for advance procurement for LCS 23. The Freedom-class ships are built by Fincantieri Marinette Marine in Marinette, Wisconsin. In December 2015, Lockheed won an $867 million seven-year contract to train Australia's next generation of military pilots. The deal also has the option to extend this contract across 26 years, which would greatly increase the deal's value.

In August 2016, Canadian Forces Maritime tested an integrated submarine combat system developed by Lockheed Martin. The test marked Canada's first use of the combat system with the MK 48 heavyweight torpedo, variant 7AT. The same month, a deal to merge Leidos with the entirety of Lockheed Martin's Information Systems & Global Solutions (IS&GS) business came to a close.

In May 2017, during a visit to Saudi Arabia by President Donald Trump, Saudi Arabia signed business deals worth tens of billions of dollars with U.S. companies, including Lockheed Martin. (See: 2017 United States–Saudi Arabia arms deal)

On August 13, 2018, Lockheed Martin announced that the company had secured a $480 million contract from the United States Air Force to develop a hypersonic weapon prototype. A hypersonic missile can travel at one mile a second. This is the second contract for hypersonic weapons that Martin has secured; The first was from the Air Force as well and for $928 million which was announced in April 2018.

On November 29, 2018, Lockheed Martin was awarded a Commercial Lunar Payload Services contract by NASA, which makes it eligible to bid on delivering science and technology payloads to the Moon for NASA, worth $2.6 billion. Lockheed Martin plans to formally propose a lander called McCandless Lunar Lander, named after the late astronaut and former Lockheed Martin employee Bruce McCandless II, who in 1984 performed the first free-flying spacewalk without a lifeline to the orbiting shuttle, using a jetpack built by the company. This lander would be based on the successful design of the Phoenix and InSight Mars landers.

On April 11, 2019, at 6:35 pm EDT, an Arabsat-6A satellite was successfully launched from (LC-39A). This satellite is one of two, the other being SaudiGeoSat-1/HellasSat-4 and they are the "most advanced commercial communications satellites ever built by" Lockheed Martin.

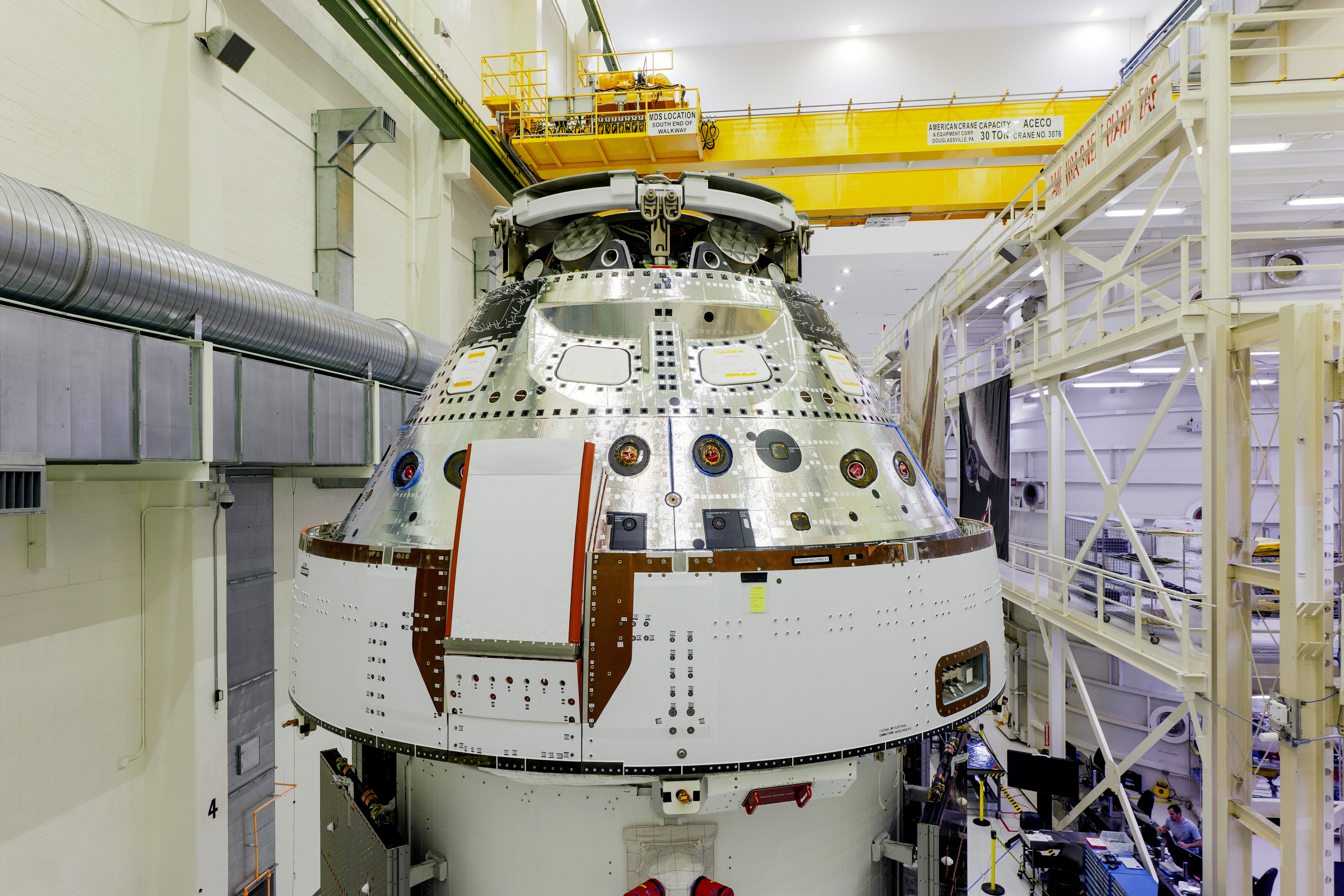
NASA Artemis II Orion assembly, March 7, 2025

On September 23, 2019, Lockheed Martin and NASA signed a $4.6-billion contract to build six or more Orion capsules for NASA's Artemis program to send astronauts to the Moon.

=== 2020s ===
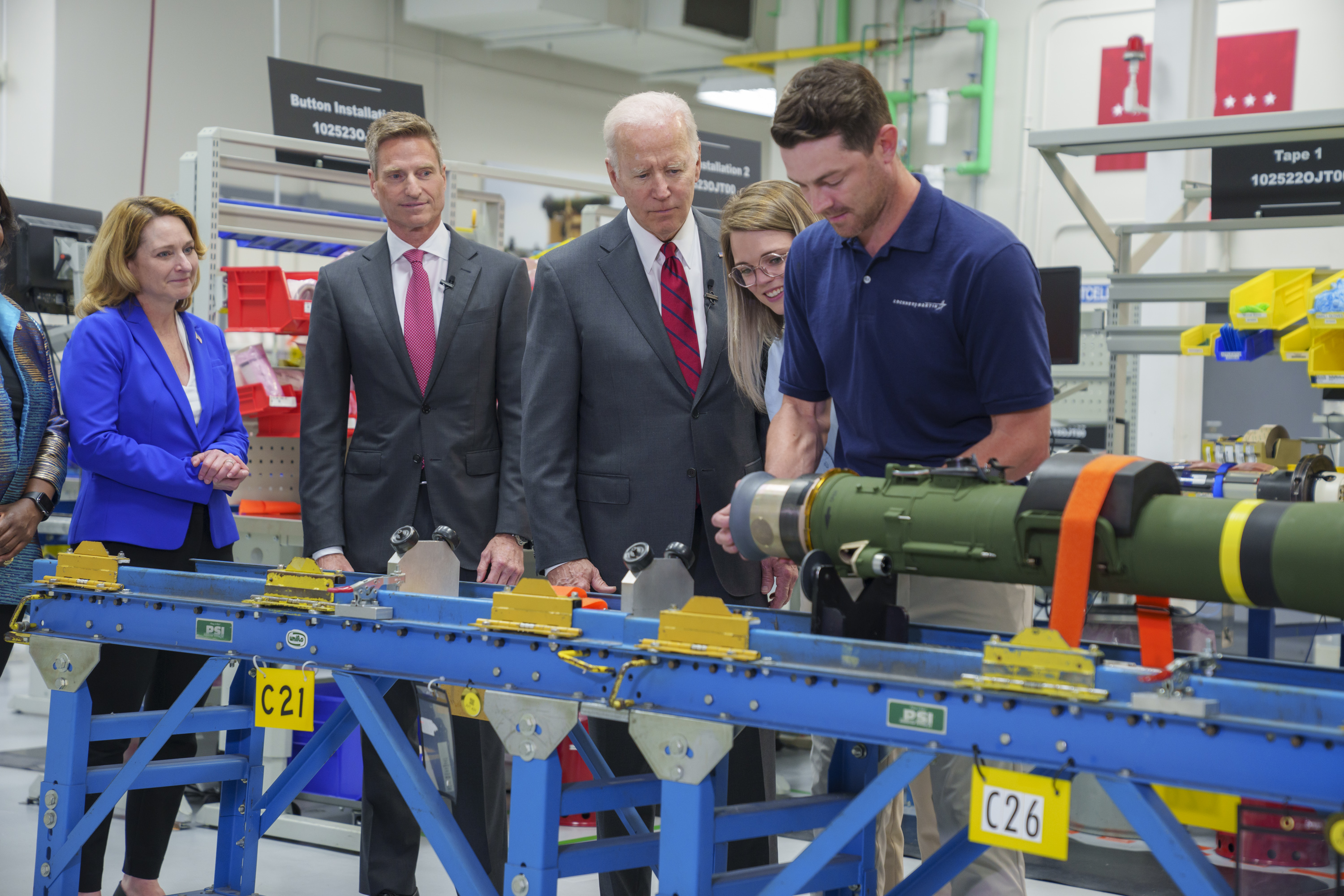
President Joe Biden at the Lockheed Martin Facility in Troy, Alabama, May 3, 2022

In January 2020, the Naval Sea Systems Command awarded Lockheed Martin with a $138 million contract related with the AEGIS Combat System Engineering Agent (CSEA). The LMT Rotary and Mission Systems (RMS) unit of the company is to develop, integrate, test, and deliver the AEGIS Advanced Capability Build (ACB) 20 integrated combat system. Martin will work on the AEGIS in New Jersey. The project is expected to be completed by December 2020. In January 2020, the Pentagon found at least 800 software defects in Lockheed Martin's F-35 fighter jets owned by the US Armed Forces during an annual review. The 2018 and 2019 reviews revealed a large number of defects as well. In February 2020, Lockheed Martin acquired Vector Launch Inc's satellite software technology GalacticSky for $4.25 million after a bankruptcy court received no bids by the February 21 deadline. On March 16, 2020, Lockheed Martin announced that James D. Taiclet would replace Marillyn Hewson as CEO, effective June 15. In January 2021, Taiclet became chairman of the company as well.

Lockheed Martin was sanctioned by the Chinese government in July 2020, October 2020, and February 2023 due to arm sales to Taiwan. On December 20, 2020, it was announced that Lockheed Martin would acquire Aerojet Rocketdyne Holdings for $4.4 billion. The acquisition was expected to close in first quarter of 2022. On February 13, 2022, Lockheed abandoned the deal following regulatory disapproval.

In 2022, due to the Russo-Ukrainian war, major arms manufacturers, including Lockheed Martin, reported a sharp increase in interim sales and profits. In May 2023, Lockheed formed a new microelectronics subsidiary ForwardEdge ASIC to design custom application-specific integrated circuits for its customers.

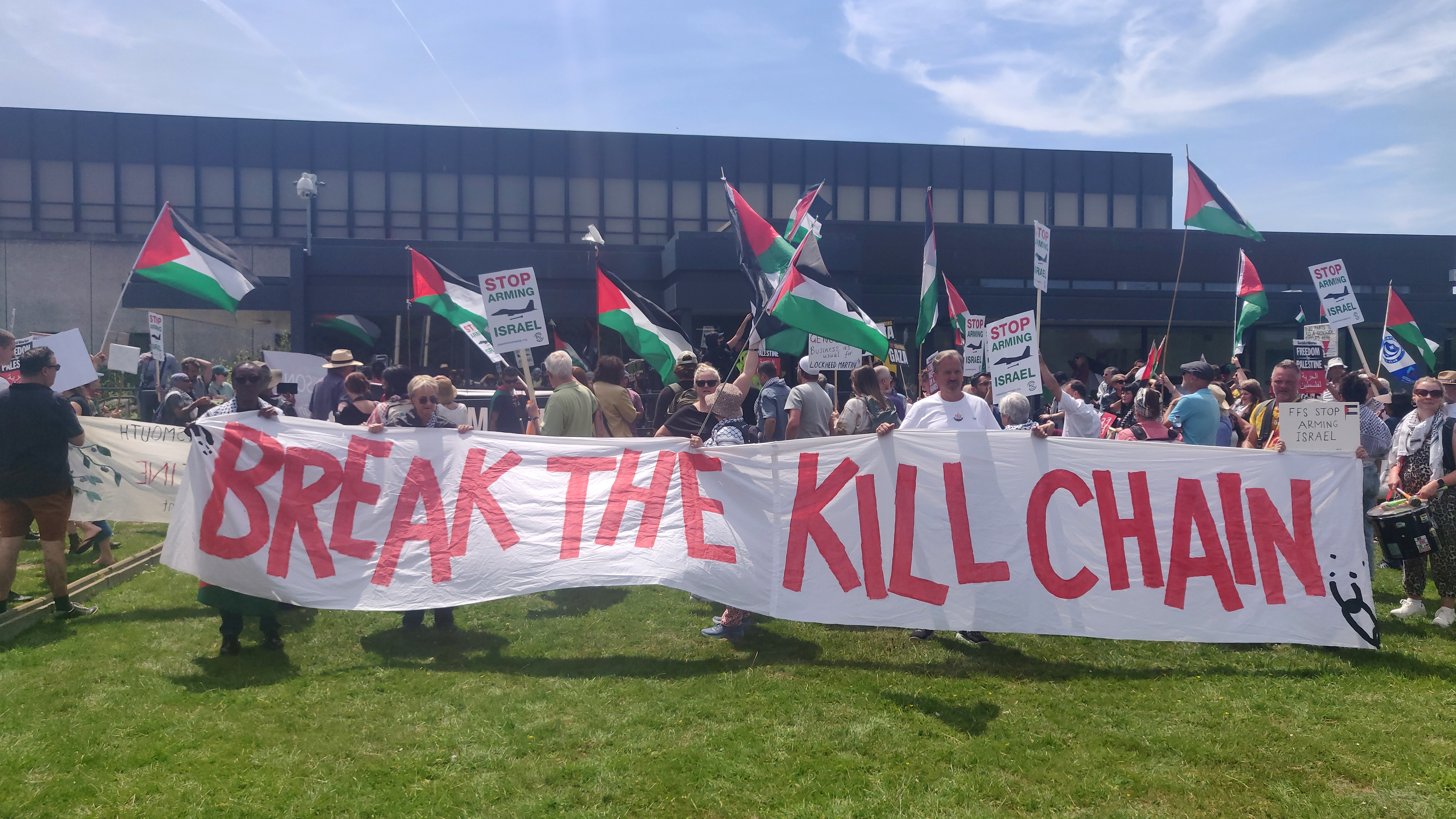
Pro-Palestinian protest calling for an arms embargo on Israel at Lockheed Martin UK in Havant, England, June 17, 2025.

In November 2023, attempts at direct action were taken against arms companies in the US and the UK, including Lockheed Martin, that supplied weapons to Israel during the Gaza war. In 2025, Lockheed Martin was included in a UN report on corporations complicit in the Gaza genocide.

In March 2024, Lockheed Martin submitted a bid to acquire Terran Orbital. On June 28, 2024, the U.S. Army awarded Lockheed Martin a $4.5 billion contract to supply Patriot Advanced Capability-3 (PAC-3) missiles. The contract included 870 PAC-3 MSE missiles and related hardware. Lockheed was tasked with manufacturing the newest version of these interceptors, with each PAC-3 MSE missile costing approximately $4 million, as per Army budget documents.

On October 9, 2024, Lockheed Martin announced the appointment of Chauncey McIntosh as vice president and general manager of the F-35 Lightning II Program, effective December 1, 2024. He succeeded Bridget Lauderdale, who retired after 38 years with the company. In December 2024, Lockheed Martin announced that it had formed a subsidiary, Astris AI, that would help U.S. defense companies to incorporate artificial intelligence into their operations.

In May 2026, the company expanded its missile production capacity further with the construction of a new 87,000-square-foot munitions facility in Alabama intended for the production of Terminal High Altitude Area Defense (THAAD) interceptors. The facility is part of a broader investment plan of approximately $8–9 billion through 2030 aimed at increasing overall missile output.

== Finances ==
Sales by business (2023)
Business	share
Aeronautics	40.7%
Rotary and Mission Systems	24.0%
Space	18.7%
Missiles and Fire Control	16.7%

For the fiscal year 2020, Lockheed Martin reported earnings of $6.833 billion, with an annual revenue of $65.398 billion, an increase of 9.3% over the previous year. Backlog was 144.0 billion at the end of 2019, up from 130.5 billion at the end of the 2018. Firm orders were $94.5 billion at the end of 2019. Its shares traded at over $389 per share. Its market capitalization was valued at US$109.83 billion at the end of 2019. Lockheed Martin ranked No. 60 in the 2019 Fortune 500 list of the largest United States corporations by total revenue (down from No. 59 in 2018).

Sales by region (2023)
Region	share
United States	73.9%
Europe	10.4%
Asia Pacific	8.7%
Middle East	5.3%
Other	1.8%

Year	Revenue in mil. US$	Net income in mil. US$	Total Assets in mil. US$	Price per Share in US$	Employees
2005	37,213	1,825	27,744	41.78	
2006	39,620	2,529	28,231	54.52	
2007	41,862	3,033	28,926	70.93	
2008	41,372	3,217	33,439	71.54	
2009	43,867	2,973	35,111	55.94	
2010	45,671	2,878	35,113	57.35	
2011	46,499	2,655	37,908	60.85	
2012	47,182	2,745	38,657	73.10	
2013	45,358	2,981	36,188	97.53	115,000
2014	39,946	3,614	37,046	151.21	112,000
2015	40,536	3,605	49,304	187.00	126,000
2016	47,248	5,302	47,806	226.05	97,000
2017	51,048	2,002	46,521	280.65	100,000
2018	53,762	5,046	44,876	261.84	105,000
2019	59,812	6,230	47,528	389.38	110,000
2020	65,398	6,833	50,710	354.98	114,000
2021	67,044	6,315	50,873	355.41	114,000
2022	65,984	5,732	52,880	486.49	116,000
2023	67,571	6,920	52,456	453.24	122,000
2024	71,043	5,336	55,617	485.94	121,000
2025	75,048	5,017	59,840	488.87	123,000

=== Q2 2025 loss in classified program ===
Lockheed profits sharply dropped 80% in Q2 2025, owing to a highly classified U.S. government aerospace program CEO James Taiclet described as "magical". The loss from development of the described "game changing" classified aerospace program totaled $1.6 billion. Taiclet stated investors would be unable to know details of the "magical" classified aerospace program for many years to come. During the same earnings call, Lockheed acknowledged the existence of a classified Lockheed Martin Missiles and Fire Control (MFC) program, described as game-changing.

== Organization ==
=== Primary business areas ===
- Lockheed Martin Aeronautics
  - Skunk Works
  - F-35 Lightning II
  - Lockheed C-130 Hercules
  - F-16 Fighting Falcon
  - F-22 Raptor
- Lockheed Martin Missiles and Fire Control
  - MIM-104 Patriot surface-to-air missile
  - Terminal High Altitude Area Defense
  - M270 Multiple Launch Rocket System
  - Precision Strike Missile
  - AGM-158 JASSM air-launched cruise missile
  - AGM-158C LRASM anti-ship missile
  - AGM-114 Hellfire
  - Apache fire-control system
  - Sniper Advanced Targeting Pod
  - Infrared search and track
  - Special forces support services
- Lockheed Martin Rotary and Mission Systems
  - Sikorsky Aircraft
    - Sikorsky UH-60 Black Hawk
    - Sikorsky HH-60 Pave Hawk
    - Sikorsky VH-92 Patriot
    - Sikorsky CH-53K King Stallion
    - Sikorsky SH-60 Seahawk
  - Aegis Combat System
  - Littoral combat ships
  - Freedom-class littoral combat ships
  - River-class destroyers
  - C2BMC missile defense program
- Lockheed Martin Space
  - UGM-133 Trident II ballistic missile
  - Orion spacecraft
  - Next-Generation Overhead Persistent Infrared
  - GPS Block III
  - hypersonic weapons
  - Ground-Based Interceptor

=== International operations ===
- Lockheed Martin UK
- Lockheed Martin Canada
- Lockheed Martin Australia

=== Enterprise operations ===
- Corporate Headquarters Operations
- Internal Corporate Functions: Ethics, Finance, HR, Legal, etc.
- Lockheed Martin Advanced Technology Laboratories

=== Wholly owned corporate subsidiaries ===
- ForwardEdge ASIC
- Lockheed Martin Finance Corporation
- LMC Properties

=== Joint ventures ===
- International Launch Services (with Khrunichev, RSC Energia)
- Lockheed Martin Alenia Tactical Transport Systems (with Alenia Aeronautica), now folded
- MEADS International (with EADS and MBDA)
- Space Imaging (46%, remainder public)
- United Launch Alliance (with Boeing)
- Javelin Joint Venture (with Raytheon)
- Longbow LLC (with Northrop Grumman)
- United Space Alliance (with Boeing)
- Kelly Aviation Center (with GE and Rolls-Royce)
- Protector USV – an unmanned surface vehicle (with Rafael Advanced Defense Systems and BAE Systems)
- Defense Support Services (DS2) with Day & Zimmermann
- Tata Lockheed Martin Aerostructures Limited (with Indian company Tata Advanced Systems)
- Advanced Military Maintenance Repair and Overhaul Center (AMMROC) (with Mubadala Development Company)

=== Divested ===
- Pacific Architects and Engineers (PAE) Holding, Inc
- SIM Industries (to CAE)

== Corporate governance ==
=== Board of directors ===
The board of directors consists of 14 members. As of 2020, members include:

- Daniel Akerson (since 2014)
- David Burritt (since 2008)
- Bruce Carlson (since 2015)
- Joseph F. Dunford (since 2020)
- James Ellis (since 2004)
- Thomas Falk (since 2010)
- Ilene S. Gordon (since 2016)
- Vicki A. Hollub (since 2018)
- Jeh Johnson (since 2018)
- Debra L. Reed-Klages (since 2019)
- James D. Taiclet (since 2018)

=== Chief executive officer ===
- Daniel Tellep (1995–1996)
- Norman Augustine (1996–1997)
- Vance Coffman (1997–2004)
- Robert J. Stevens (2004–2012)
- Marillyn Hewson (2013–2020)
- James D. Taiclet (2020–present)

=== Chairman of the board ===
- Robert J. Stevens (2005–2013)
- Marillyn Hewson (2014–2021)
- James D. Taiclet (2021-present)

=== Ownership ===
As of December 2023, Lockheed Martin shares are mainly held by institutional investors (State Street Corporation, Vanguard group, BlackRock, Capital Group Companies, and others).

Largest shareholders in December 2023
Shareholder	Country	Shares	Percentage	Value in thousands USD
State Street Corporation	United States	37,049,916	15.33%	$16,113,379
The Vanguard Group	United States	22,099,137	9.15%	$9,611,136
BlackRock Inc.	United States	18,158,813	7.51%	$7,897,449
Charles Schwab Corporation	United States	5,637,923	2.33%	$2,451,989
Morgan Stanley	United States	5,206,242	2.15%	$2,264,247
Capital World Investors	United States	5,031,450	2.08%	$2,188,228
Geode Capital Management, LLC	United States	4,559,183	1.89%	$1,982,834
FMR, LLC	United States	4,351,452	1.80%	$1,892,490
Bank of America	United States	3,209,854	1.33%	$1,395,998
Wellington Management Company	United States	2,807,469	1.16%	$1,220,996
Total		179,583,655	100%	

=== Criticism ===
Lockheed Martin is listed as the largest U.S. government contractor and ranks first for the number of incidents, and fifth for the size of settlements on the 'contractor misconduct' database maintained by the Project on Government Oversight, a Washington, D.C.–based watchdog group. Since 1995, the company has agreed to pay $676.8 million to settle 88 instances of misconduct.

In 2015, Lockheed Martin agreed to pay $4.7 million to settle charges that it illegally used taxpayer money to lobby the federal government to block competitors, including by funneling funds through its subsidiary, Sandia Corporation. This involved hiring former Representative Heather Wilson, one of the most influential ex-lawmakers in the defense sector, as an unregistered lobbyist to maintain Lockheed's lucrative nuclear weapons lab contracts. More broadly, commentators have criticized Lockheed Martin and other weapons defense firms for using secretive spending and dark money to influence defense policy, raising concerns about reduced accountability and national security risks.

In 2013, Lt. Gen. Christopher Bogdan criticized the company's F-35 fighter program. The general said: "I want them both to start behaving like they want to be around for 40 years ... I want them to take on some of the risk of this program. I want them to invest in cost reductions. I want them to do the things that will build a better relationship. I'm not getting all that love yet." The criticism came in the wake of previous criticism from former Defense Secretary Robert Gates regarding the same program.

Lockheed Martin has highlighted the conflicts in Gaza and Ukraine as potential opportunities for future revenue growth.

In March 2026, a panel of the Fifth Circuit Court of Appeals revived a qui tam lawsuit in United States ex rel. Ferguson v. Lockheed Martin Corp. The case involves allegations that the company violated the Truth in Negotiations Act and the False Claims Act by providing inaccurate labor cost data during negotiations for the F-35 program.

=== Lobbying ===
According to the magazine Politico, Lockheed Martin has "a political network that is already the envy of its competitors", and its contracts enjoy wide bipartisan support in the U.S. Congress thanks to it having "perfected the strategy of spreading jobs on weapons programs in key states and congressional districts". The company's 2022 lobbying expenditure is $13.6 million (2009 total: $13.7 million).

Through its political action committee (PAC), the company provides low levels of financial support to candidates who advocate national defense and relevant business issues. It was the largest contributor to the House Armed Services Committee chairman, Republican Buck McKeon of California with over $50,000 donated in the election cycle as of January 2011. It also was the top donor to Sen. Daniel Inouye (D-HI), the chair of the Senate Appropriations Committee before his death in 2012.

Lockheed Martin Employees Political Action Committee is one of the 50 largest in the country, according to FEC data. With contributions from 3,000 employees, it donates $500,000 a year to about 260 House and Senate candidates.

In 2025, Lockheed Martin was one of the donors who funded the Trump administration's East Wing demolition and planned building of a ballroom. A 2026 report found that no single donor to Trump's ballroom project subsequently received more federal government contracts than Lockheed Martin.

== Management ==
Senior management consists of the CEO, CFO, and Executive Vice Presidents (EVPs) of four business areas. The EVPs are responsible for managing major programs.

On March 16, 2020, Lockheed announced that CEO Marillyn Hewson would become executive chair and be succeeded as CEO by James Taiclet on June 15; Taiclet was at the time the head of American Tower, and had previously been the president of Honeywell Aerospace and before that a VP at United Technologies. Lockheed also announced that it would create the chief operating officer role, to which current EVP Frank A. St John would be promoted.

Employees in each program are organized into four tiers: Tier 1: Program Manager/VP, Tier 2: Functional Teams (Finance, Chief Engineer, Quality, Operations, etc.), Tier 3: Integrated Product Teams (IPTs) (Weapon System Development, Weapon System Integration, etc.), and Tier 4: detailed product development. Floor or touch workers belong to component assembly teams. Lockheed Martin manages and maintains its relationship with these touch workers through its supervisors and unions.

Lockheed Martin manages employees through its Full Spectrum Leadership and LM21 programs. The LM21 program relies on Six Sigma principles, which are techniques to improve efficiency. Senior management constructs leadership councils and assigns managers to facilitate Kaizen events, which target specific processes for improvement. A manager facilitates teams and processes stakeholders and suppliers to streamline process implementation.

Tier 2 Functional Leads and Tier 3 IPT Leads report to Tier 1. IPT leads are responsible for entire systems or products defined by the contract's Statement of Work.

To control quality, Lockheed Martin trains and builds IPT teams. and ensures that work is executed correctly through a Technical Performance Measure (TPM) system which emphasizes its Lean and 6 Sigma processes. Middle management uses commitment mechanisms that parallel high commitment and human relations theory.

Floor employees assemble aircraft using Flow-to-takt lean manufacturing process which uses properties from both division of labor and scientific management. By separating tasks based on parts, Lockheed Martin utilizes the division of labor theory, specialization on a specific area creates efficiency.

=== Double Helix methodology ===
The "Double Helix methodology" is a systems development methodology used by Lockheed Martin. It combines experimentation, technology, and a warfighter's concept of operations to create new tactics and weapons.

== See also ==
- Arms industry
- Military–industrial complex
- Defense contractor – table of comparable companies
- Lockheed Martin Maintenance Trophy
- Top 100 US Federal Contractors
