= AN/UYQ-70 =

Console

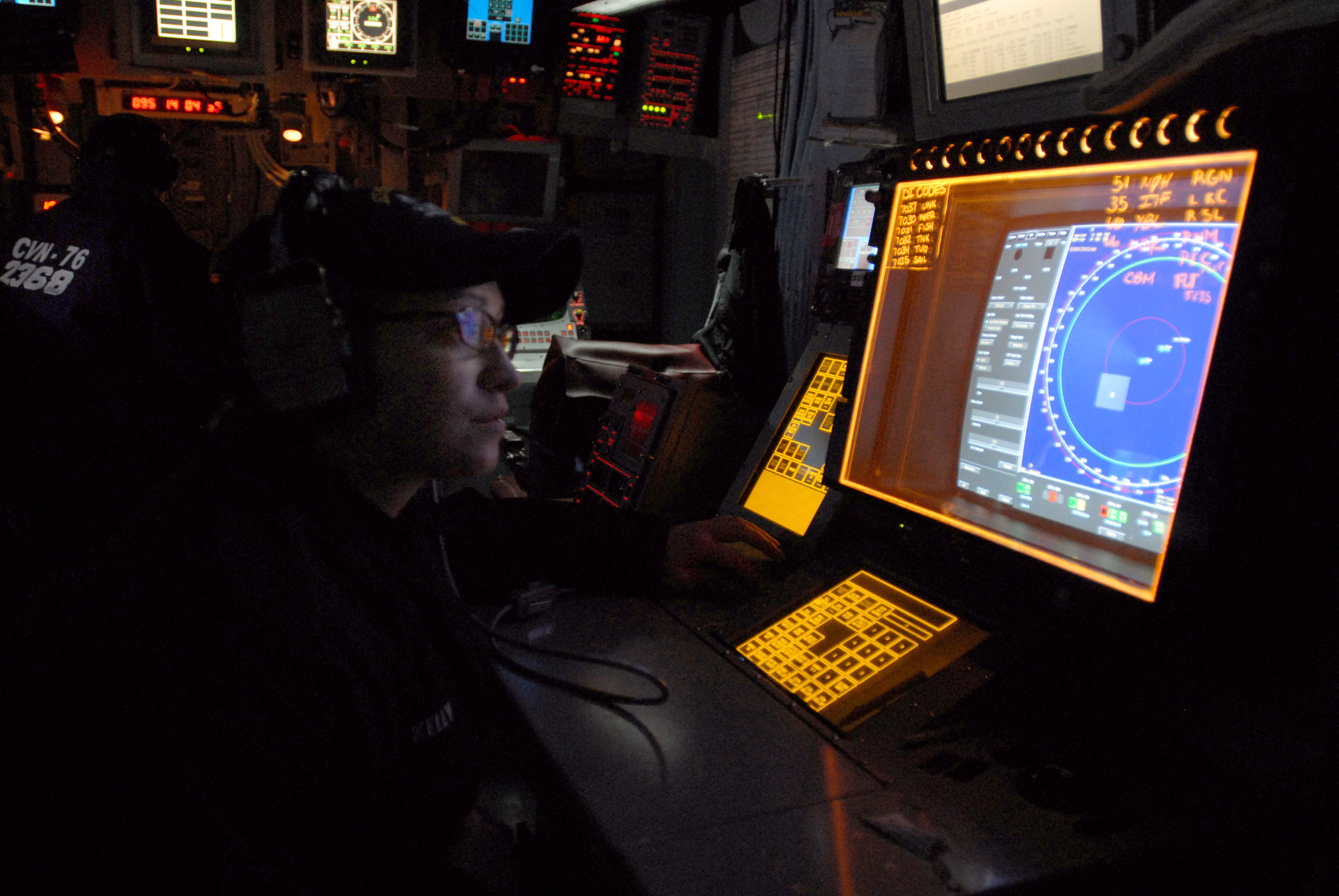
UYQ-70 (C&D)

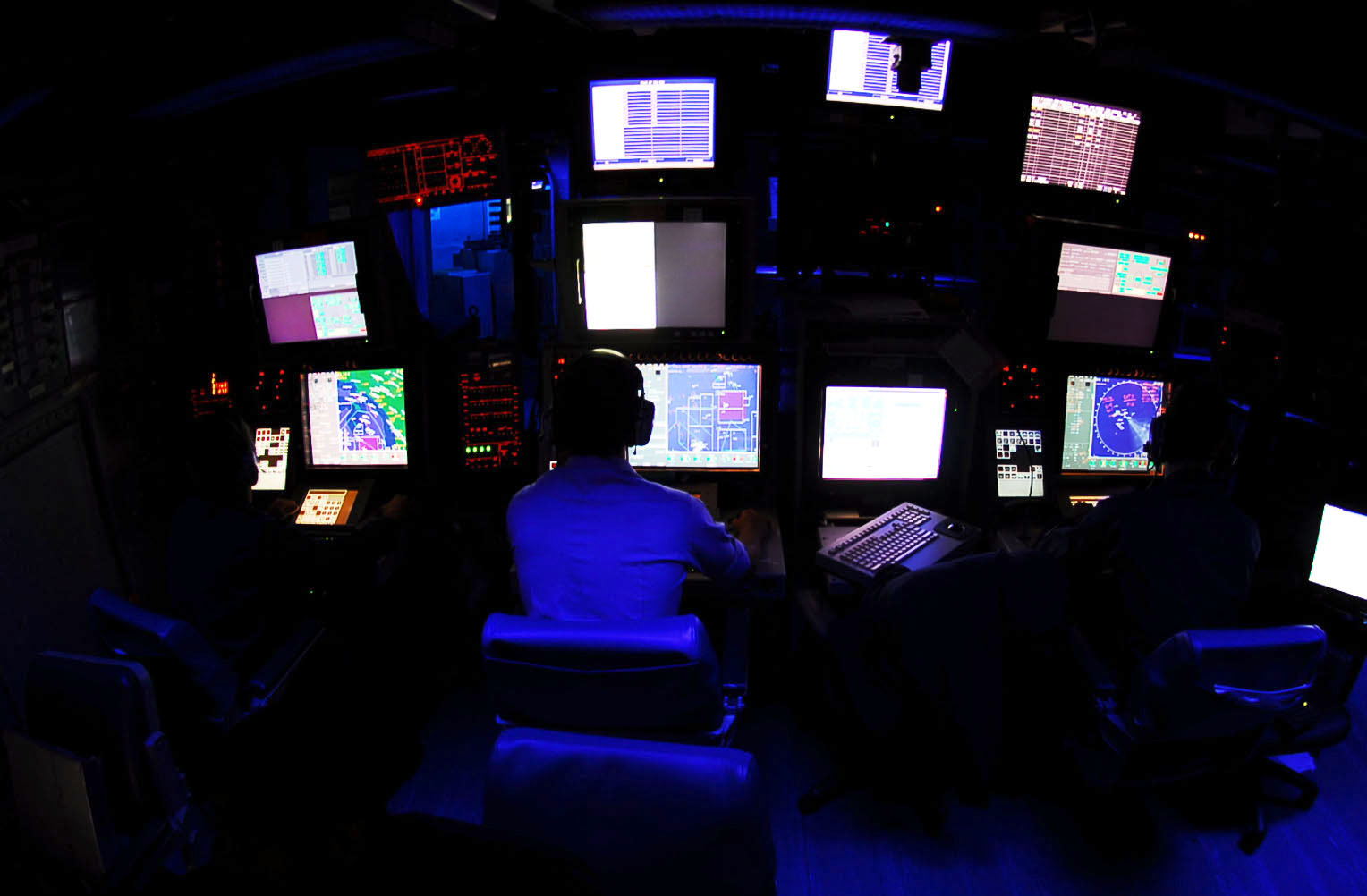
Various UYQ-70 terminals

AN/UYQ-70 (Q-70) is the specification for a family of United States Navy display workstations. Starting in 1991, it replaced the AN/UYA-4 and AN/UYQ-21 (series) displays and various submarine combat system displays: AN/BQQ-5(V) Control Display Console (CDC), Improved Control Display Console (ICDC), Mk 81 Mod(v) Combat Control System control and display consoles and various navigation and imaging display equipment.

In accordance with the Joint Electronics Type Designation System (JETDS), the "AN/UYQ-70" designation represents the 70th design of an Army-Navy electronic device for general utility data processing special combination equipment. The JETDS system also now is used to name all Department of Defense electronic systems.

== Components ==
The Q-70 supports the Intel x86, PowerPC, SPARC, and HP PA-RISC processing families as well as commercial operating systems including Solaris, Windows NT, HP-UX and VxWorks.

The family architecture is based on a single-board 6U VME RISC processor, currently the 165 MHz Hewlett Packard HP744. This has up to 512 Mio (1 Gio in two slot units) of dual-ported, error-correcting RAM with HP-UX for non real-time operations, or HP-RT operating systems for real-time operations.

There are two graphics engine options available. Esterline offers 30 million vectors/s up to 2,048 × 2,048 resolution with 12 underlay and 12 overlay planes. The HP Graphics option provides 31 million pixels/s up to 1,280 × 1,024 resolution and eight underlay and eight overlay planes. The video frame grabber has a 30 Hz frame rate with up to two windows managed by the X Window System using the Motif GUI.

Originally the ADS used CMS-2 language software. This was later supplemented by, or replaced with, C and Ada.

== See also ==
- List of military electronics of the United States
