= List of equipment of the Defense Forces of Georgia =

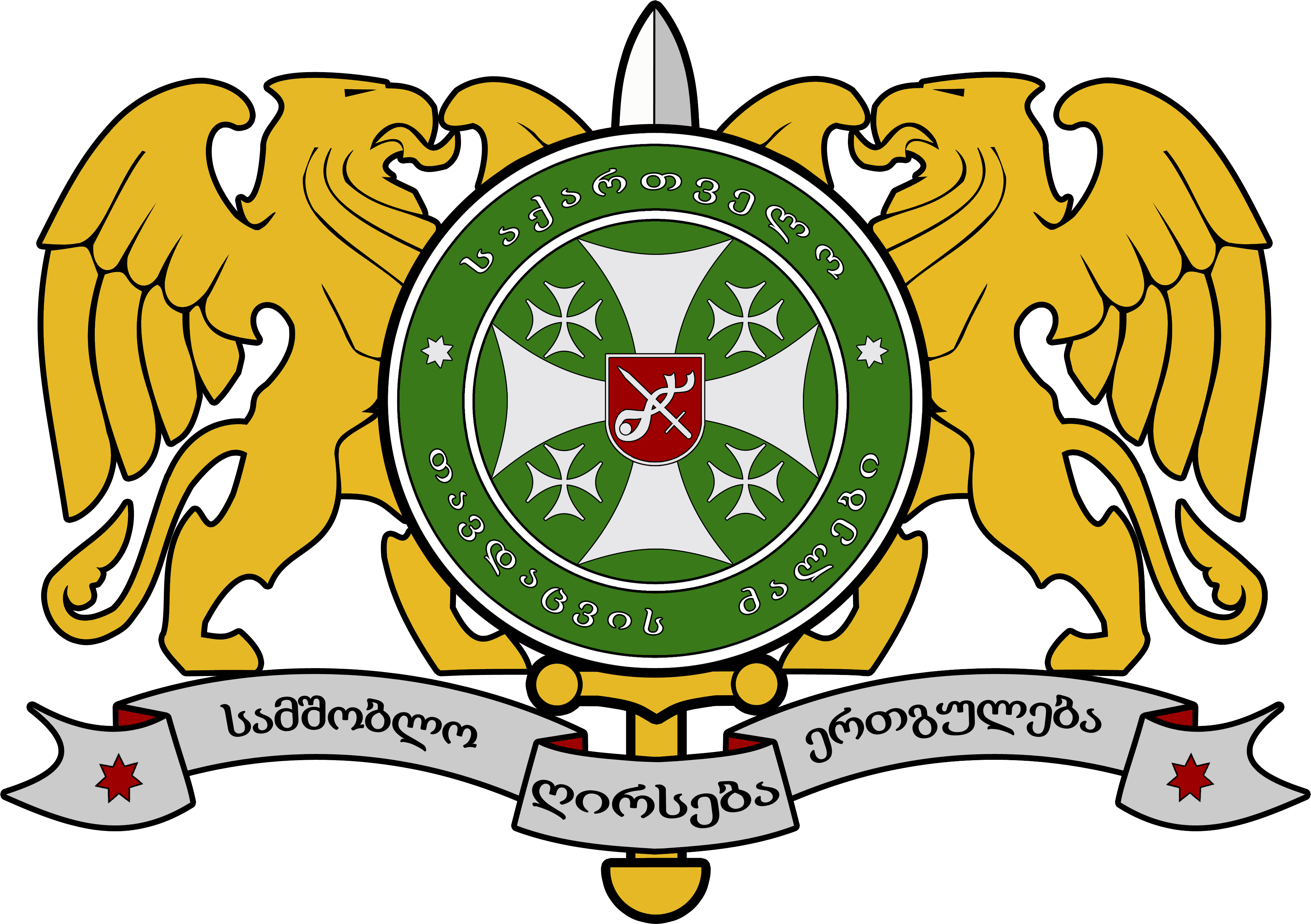
Georgian Defense Forces Emblem

This is a list of the modern equipment in the Georgian Defence Forces.

== Small arms ==
=== Pistols ===
Weapon	Photo	Origin	Notes
Jericho 941		Israel	Large usage within army.
Glock 17; Glock 19 Gen 4 Glock 21; Glock 18		Austria	Sidearm of the special operations forces.
CZ 75		Czechoslovakia	
SIG Sauer P226		Switzerland	
Heckler & Koch USP		Germany	

=== Shotguns ===
Weapon	Photo	Origin	Notes
Benelli M4		Italy	In use with special operation forces.

=== Submachine guns ===
Weapon	Photo	Origin	Notes
Heckler & Koch MP5; Heckler & Koch MP5SD; Heckler & Koch MP5K		West Germany / Germany	In use with special operations forces.

=== Carbines ===
Weapon	Photo	Origins	Notes
AKS-74U		Soviet Union	Used by various units as a personal defense weapon.
M4A1; M4A1 SOPMOD; M4A2; M4A3		United States	Main service weapon of the Georgian military.

=== Assault rifles ===
Weapon	Photo	Origin	Notes
AK-47		Soviet Union	Retired
AKM; AKMS		Soviet Union / People's Republic of Bulgaria	Former service rifle. Some used by Territorial Defence Forces.
PM md. 63/65		Romania	Issued mainly for exercises in Romania.
AK-74; AKS-74		Soviet Union	Former main service rifle. Standard issue rifle of Reserve and Territorial Defence Forces.
AR-M1		Bulgaria	3500 5.45 AR-M1 rifles imported
AMD-65		Hungarian People's Republic / Hungary	1186 rifles were delivered in 2008
AS Val		Soviet Union	in service with special operations forces.

=== Sniper rifles ===
Weapon	Photo	Origin	Notes
Designated marksman rifles
IMI Galatz		Israel	Standard issue designated marksman rifle
VSS Vintorez		Soviet Union	In use with special operations forces.
SVD		Soviet Union	Former standard-issue designated marksman rifle, used in exercises and by the Territorial Defense Forces.
Bolt action
Desert Tech SRS		United States	Medium-long range sniper rifle
M24 Sniper Weapon System		United States	Standard issue sniper rifle
Sako TRG-22/42		Finland	Long range sniper rifle
Brügger & Thomet APR		Switzerland	Medium-long range sniper rifle

=== Anti-materiel rifles ===
Weapon	Photo	Origin	Notes
Bolt action
Barrett M95		United States	Used by special operations forces.
McMillan Tac-50		United States	Issued mainly to special operations forces.
Zastava M93 Black Arrow		Serbia	In service with the land forces.
Semi-automatic
Barrett M82		United States	Used by special operations forces.

=== Machine guns ===
Weapon	Photo	Origin	Notes
Light machine guns
M249		United States	Standard issue squad automatic weapon. 600 SAWs received in 2020.
IMI Negev		Israel	Standard issue squad automatic weapon.
RPK		Soviet Union	Former standard-issue squad automatic weapon. Currently standard issue of Georgian Reserve Territorial Defence Forces and special operations command.
General-purpose machine guns
M240		United States	standard-issue general-purpose machine gun, gradually replacing the PK machine gun.
PK machine gun PKM		Soviet Union	Standard issue general-purpose machine gun.
Heavy machine guns
M2HB		United States	Acquired in 2021 from the United States.
DShK/DShKM		Soviet Union	heavy machine gun, mounted on T-55 tanks, Otokar Cobra and some on Humvees.
NSV machine gun		Russia	Standard issue heavy machine gun, used on T-72 tanks and Didgori-1 APC. Some also used in ground support and Anti-air roles.
Rotary machine guns
M134 Minigun		United States	Support role, air and ground vehicles

=== Grenade launchers ===
Weapon	Photo	Origin	Notes
Belt-fed automatic grenade launchers
AGS-17		Soviet Union	Former grenade launcher of Georgian army
MK 19		United States	Standard issue grenade launcher acquired in 2021 from the United States.

=== Grenades ===
Weapon	Photo	Origin	Notes
F1		Soviet Union; Georgia	Fragmentation grenade
RGD-5		Soviet Union; Georgia	Fragmentation grenade
RGN		Soviet Union	Offensive grenade
RGO		Soviet Union	Defensive grenade
M84		United States	Stun grenade
AN M18		United States	Smoke grenade

=== Anti-personnel mines ===
Weapon	Photo	Origin	Notes
MON-50		Soviet Union	Directional anti-personnel mine.
POMZ-2		Soviet Union	Stake mounted anti-personnel fragmentation mine.
M18 Claymore mine		United States	Directional anti-personnel mine.

== Anti armor systems ==
=== Anti-tank mines ===
Weapon	Photo	Origin	Notes
RD-7		Georgia	Off-route mine
TM-62 series of mines		Soviet Union	Anti-tank blast mine
TM-57 mine		Soviet Union	Anti-tank blast mine

=== Anti-armor grenade launcher ===
Weapon	Photo	Origin	Notes
Reusable grenade launcher
RPG-7G		Georgia	Based on RPG-7. Lighter, life expectancy increased to 1000 rounds, Compatible with all types of RPG-7 rounds.
RPG-7		Soviet Union; Georgia	Standard issue anti-tank grenade launcher
Single-shot grenade launcher
C90		Spain	Acquired in 2023
PDM-1		Georgia	Domestically produced RPG-26 variant
RPG-26		Soviet Union	
RPG-22		Soviet Union; Bulgaria	
RPG-18		Soviet Union	
M80 Zolja		Yugoslavia	Acquired from Serbia
AT4		Sweden	Used in training exercises and by special operations forces
Recoilless gun
SPG-9 recoilless rifle		Soviet Union	
Flamethrower
RPO-A Shmel		Soviet Union	

=== Anti-tank missile systems ===
Weapon	Photo	Origin	Notes
MANPATS
9K111 Fagot		Soviet Union	Designated AT-4 Spigot by NATO. 600 missiles delivered in 2006-2007 from Bulgaria.
9M113 Konkurs		Soviet Union	Designated AT-5 Spandrel by NATO.
9K115 Metis		Soviet Union	Designated AT-7 Spriggan by NATO.
Skif		Belarus; Ukraine	
FGM-148 Javelin		United States	72 CLUs, 10 basic skills trainers and 410 missiles delivered in 2018–2019 from the United States. Contracts were signed in 2020 for the production and delivery of missiles to Georgia in the future. The sale of further 46 CLUs and 82 missiles was approved by the US in 2021.
Vehicle-launched anti-tank guided missiles
9K114 Shturm		Soviet Union	Used on Mi-24 gunships. 758 missiles delivered in 2006 from Kazakhstan
Kombat		Ukraine	Used by T-72 tanks. 400 missiles delivered in 2007 from Ukraine.

== Mortars ==
Vehicle	Photo	Origin	Versions	Number	Notes
120MM
M75		Yugoslavia	120 mm	33 as of 2022	Delivers 12 rounds per minute within a firing radius of max 6.4 km. Crew 5
2B11		Soviet Union	120 mm	14 2S12 as of 2022	Delivers 15 rounds per minute within a firing radius of max 7.18 km. Crew 5
GM-120		Georgia / Georgia	120 mm	N/A	Delivers 15 rounds per minute within a firing radius of min 480 m to max 7.1 km. Crew 5
Soltam K6		United States; Israel	120 mm	18 as of 2022	Delivers 16 rounds per minute within a firing radius of max 7.24 km. Crew 4
82MM
GM-82		Georgia / Georgia	82 mm	N/A	Firing radius of min 400 m to max 3.05 km. Crew 4
2B14 Podnos		Soviet Union	82 mm	N/A	Firing radius of 4 km. Crew 4
M69 Mortar		Yugoslavia	82 mm	25	Firing radius of 4 km. Crew 4
Infantry mortars
GNM-60 "Mkudro"		Georgia	60 mm	N/A	Noise reduced close fire support mortar for concealed operations. Delivers 30 rounds per minute within a firing radius of 500 m. Crew: 1
M224 Handheld		United States	60 mm	N/A	Delivers 20-30 rounds per minute within a firing radius of 1.3 km. Crew: 1–3
M57 mortar		Yugoslavia	60 mm	50	Delivers 25-30 rounds per minute within a firing radius of 2.5 km. Crew: 3
GM-60; GM-60LB		Georgia	60 mm	N/A	GM-60: Delivers 15 rounds per minute within a firing radius of 3 km. Crew: 3 GM-60LB: Delivers 15 rounds per minute within a firing radius of 4.05 km. Crew: 3
Hirtenberger M6C-210		Austria	60 mm	N/A	Delivers 15-30 rounds per minute within a firing radius of 3 km. Crew: 3

== Vehicles ==
=== Armored vehicles ===
Vehicle	Image	Origin	Role	Number	Notes
Main battle tanks
T-72SIM1 T-72B		Czechoslovakia; Soviet Union; Israel; Georgia; Georgia	Main battle tank	132	~200 total .Upgraded T-72 Sim-1 variants in service which was upgraded in Georgia with the assistance of Israel. Added GPS navigation systems, thermal vision, target acquisition system, and tactical combat map with friend-or-foe recognition system.
Infantry fighting vehicles
BMP-1; BMP-1U		Soviet Union Ukraine; Georgia; Europe	Infantry fighting vehicle	25+	140+ total
BMP-2		Soviet Union Ukraine; Georgia	Infantry fighting vehicle	46+	
Armoured personnel carriers
Nurol Ejder		Turkey	Armoured personnel carrier	retired	72 in reserve. Delivered in 2009 from Turkey. all of them were returned back to Turkey in exchange of BMC Vurans and subsequently transferred to Syria.
BTR-80		Soviet Union Georgia	Armoured personnel carrier	19+	
BTR-70		Soviet Union Ukraine; Georgia; Italy	Armoured personnel carrier	25+	
MT-LB		Soviet Union	Armoured tracked vehicle	66+	
Wolf Armoured Vehicle		Israel	Armoured personnel carrier	28	Delivered in 2009 from Israel.
MRAP
BMC Vuran		Turkey	MRAP	46	Delivered in 2024 from Turkey.
Didgori-3		Georgia	MRAP	N/A	
MaxxPro		United States	MRAP	N/A	Lend for exercises.
Infantry mobility and scout vehicles
Didgori-2		Georgia	Infantry mobility vehicle	N/A	
Didgori-1		Georgia	Infantry mobility vehicle	N/A	Variants: – Infantry mobility vehicle – Armored reconnaissance vehicle – Medical evacuation vehicle – Command and control unit – Fire support vehicle (open turret machine gun) – Patrol vehicle (remotely controlled weapon station) – Platform for anti tank guided missiles – Platform for surface to air missiles – Platform for light artillery / mortar weapons
Humvee		United States	Light utility vehicle	40	Donated by the United States. Used by regular units and military police.
Otokar Cobra		Turkey	Infantry mobility vehicle	N/	
BRDM-2		Soviet Union; Georgia / Georgia	Scout car	17	17 in reserve. 40 inherited by soviet union Upgrade includes remote weapon platform, 23×152mm 2A14 auto canon. Additional windshields or hatches have been added as well as two side doors in replacement for the rear door. The bottom side armor has been V-shaped for better protection against mines. Improved frontal armor and smoke grenade dischargers on each side. Periscopes were replaced by digital displays connected to multiple multi-imaging devices for driver and gunner set to be replaced by nato versions in 2024.
Military engineering vehicles
IMR-2		Soviet Union	Heavy combat engineering vehicle	N/A	
MT-55		Soviet Union	Armoured vehicle-launched bridge	N/A	
MTU-20		Soviet Union	Armoured vehicle-launched bridge	N/A	
TMM-3		Soviet Union	Truck-launched bridge	N/A	
UR-77		Soviet Union	Demining vehicle	N/A	
BTS-5		Soviet Union	Armoured recovery vehicle	N/A	
GMZ-2		Soviet Union	Combat engineering vehicle	N/A	
BAT-2		Soviet Union Ukraine	Combat engineering vehicle	N/A	
PMZ-2		Soviet Union Ukraine	Trencher	N/A	

=== Unarmoured vehicles ===
Vehicle	Image	Origin	Role	Notes
Logistic and transport trucks
MAZ-537		Soviet Union	Heavy military truck	Used for transporting heavy equipment.
Kamaz		Soviet Union	Military truck	Used for various roles.
Ural-375		Soviet Union	Military truck	Used for supplies transport, also used as launch platform for BM-21 Grad.
Tatra 813		Czechoslovakia	Military truck	Used as platform for RM-70 multiple launch rocket system and SpGH DANA.
Unimog		Germany	Military truck	Used in limited numbers.
MAN TG-range		Germany	Military truck	Over 300 MAN TG-range and Iveco Trakker purchased in 2021.
Mercedes-Benz Actros		Germany	Military truck	Used as launch platform for LAR-160 multiple launch rocket system.
Rheinmetall MAN Military Vehicles		Germany	Military truck	Used by engineering brigade.
Iveco Trakker		Italy	Military truck	Over 300 MAN TG-range and Iveco Trakker purchased in 2021.
Roman		Romania	Military truck	Used as launch platform for SPYDER surface-to-air missile.
KrAZ-6322		Ukraine	Military truck	Used in troop and supplies transport role, also used as basis for RS-122 multiple launch rocket system. Main logistic truck of the Georgian Army.
M35A2/A3		United States	Military truck	Used for troop transport.
Light truck and vehicles
Iveco Daily		ITA	Light van	Mobile refrigerator.
Toyota Corolla		Japan	Light car	Used by military police.
Toyota Hilux		Japan	Pickup truck	Many vehicles in service, used for various roles.
Toyota Land Cruiser		Japan	Pickup truck	Used in logistical roles, some configured as mobile command posts.
Mitsubishi L200		Japan	Pickup truck	Used by Military Police
Renault Duster		France	Light car	Used by Military Police
Hyundai Starex		South Korea	Light van	
Land Rover Defender		United Kingdom	Light military truck	Used for various roles.
Ford Transit		United States	Light commercial van	Mainly used for medical purposes.
Ford Ranger		United States	Pickup truck	160 Ford Rangers acquired in 2020 as part of ongoing modernization programs.
Polaris Industries XP 1000 S		United States	All-terrain vehicle	Granted by Germany in 2023
Engineering vehicles
Liebherr LTM 1030–2.1		Switzerland	Mobile crane	Granted by Germany in 2023
Unmanned ground vehicles
AeroVironment tEODor UGV		United States	Ordnance disposal robot	Granted by Germany in 2023
AeroVironment telemax EVO		United States	Ordnance disposal robot	Granted by Germany in 2023

== Field artillery ==
Vehicle	Photo	Origin	Versions	Number	Notes
Multiple rocket launcher systems
LAR-160		Israel	160 mm	12	
RM-70		Czechoslovakia	122 mm	18	
BM-21 Grad		Soviet Union	122 mm	13	
RS-122		Georgia	122 mm	8+	
Self-propelled artillery
152 mm SpGH DANA		Czechoslovakia	152 mm	32	
2S3 Akatsiya		Soviet Union	152 mm	13	
2S1 Gvozdika		Soviet Union	122 mm	20	
Towed artillery guns
152 mm towed gun-howitzer M1955 (D-20)		Soviet Union	152 mm	12	
122 mm howitzer 2A18 (D-30)		Soviet Union	122 mm	58	
152 mm Giatsint-B		Soviet Union	152 mm	3	
152 mm Msta-B		Soviet Union	152 mm	10	
85 mm anti-tank gun D-48		Soviet Union	85 mm	retired	
Anti-tank guns
MT-12		Soviet Union	100 mm	16	
85 mm divisional gun D-44		Soviet Union	85 mm	N/A	

== Air-defense ==
=== Anti-aircraft artillery ===
Vehicle	Photo	Origin	Number	Notes
ZU-23-2		Soviet Union	~200	40 of them are Used on MTLBs and on Ural ZIL trucks.
57 mm AZP S-60		Soviet Union	20	Retired
Self-propelled anti-aircraft weapon
ZSU-23-4		Soviet Union	12	More than 8 acquired from the Soviet Union

=== Man-portable air-defense systems ===
Weapon	Photo	Origin	Number	Notes
Strela-2M		Soviet Union	N/A	
9K34 Strela-3		Soviet Union	N/A	
9K38 Igla		Soviet Union	N/A	
PZR Grom		Poland	N/A	30 launchers and 100 missiles delivered from Poland in 2007.
Piorun		Poland	N/A	Unknown number ordered in 2024
FIM-92 Stinger		United States	N/A	Unknown number ordered in 2018

=== Missile systems ===
Vehicle	Photo	Origin	Number	Notes
High to medium air defense
SPYDER-MR		Israel	3 Launchers	Medium range (35-50 km) In 2025, a Ukrainian Antonov An-124 cargo aircraft reportedly transported three additional launchers from Israel to Georgia.
Buk-M1		Soviet Union; Ukraine	1 battery	Medium range (35km); 96 9M38 missiles delivered in 2007–2008 from Ukraine.
Multirole
SPYDER-SR		Israel	1 battery	Short range (20km); 1 battery and 75 Python-5 missiles delivered in 2008 from Israel.
Short range air defense
Osa-AKM		Soviet Union; Ukraine; Belarus	8 systems	Short range (15 km); Six +eight systems + 48 missiles delivered from Ukraine in 2006–2008.
Mistral ATLAS		France	6 systems	Delivered from France in 2018.

=== Radars ===
Vehicle	Photo	Origin	Number	Notes
Electronic warfare support measures
Ground Master 403		France	1 system delivered from France in 2018	High-altitude, long range air defence sensor.
Ground Master 200		France	2 systems delivered from France in 2018	Medium range multi-mission tactical radar.
P-18 radar		Soviet Union	N/A	Very high frequency radar.
1L117		Soviet Union	N/A	
ST-68U		Ukraine	N/A	2 systems delivered from Ukraine in 2006.
Kolchuga passive sensor		Ukraine	2	Electronic support measures. 2 systems delivered from Ukraine in 2008.

== Aircraft ==
Vehicle	Photo	Origin	Number	Notes
Unmanned aerial vehicles
SWAN III		Georgia; Estonia	N/A	Experimental Project
WB Electronics Warmate		Georgia; Poland	at least 10 were delivered from Poland in 2023; N/A since production as of 2024.	Loitering munition. A total of 100 drones were ordered in 2022. Additionally, joint production was set up in 2023 to manufacture Warmate drones in Georgia. The first domestically produced Warmates were successfully tested in late 2023.
WB Electronics FlyEye		Georgia; Poland	N/A	Reconnaissance drone. Joint Georgian-Polish production started in 2023 and will produce hundreds of drones per year.
Aerostar		Israel	N/A	2 delivered in 2005 from Israel
Elbit Skylark		Israel		
Atlantic I		Spain	N/A	
Alpha 800 VTOL		Spain	N/A	
DJI M300 RTK series		China	N/A	Deployed as reconnaissance drone and loitering munition.
DJI Mavic 3		China	N/A	Deployed as reconnaissance drone and loitering munition.
DJI Mavic 2		China	N/A	Deployed as reconnaissance drone and loitering munition.

=== Aircraft armament ===
Weapon	Photo	Origin	Notes
Bombs
FAB-250M		Soviet Union	Low-Drag General Purpose (LDGP) bomb (550 lb)
FAB-500M		Soviet Union	Low-Drag General Purpose (LDGP) bomb (1100 lb)
KAB-500L		Soviet Union	Laser guided bomb
Mark 82 bomb GBU-54		United States	Low-Drag General Purpose (LDGP) bomb (500 lb); GPS/INS guided bomb
Mark 83 bomb GBU-32		United States	Low-Drag General Purpose (LDGP) bomb (1000 lb); GPS/INS guided bomb
Mark 84 bomb GBU-31		United States	Low-Drag General Purpose (LDGP) bomb (2000 lb); GPS/INS guided bomb
Air-to air-missiles
R-60M AA-8 Aphid		Soviet Union; Georgia	Short-range air-to-air missile
R-73M AA-11 Archer		Soviet Union; Georgia	Short-range air-to-air missile
Air-to-surface missiles
Kh-25M; Kh-25MT; Kh-25MP		Soviet Union	Laser guided air-to-surface missile TV guided air-to-surface missile Anti-radiation air-to-surface missile
Kh-29L; Kh-29T		Soviet Union	Laser guided air-to-surface missile TV guided air-to-surface missile
Rockets
S-5M		Soviet Union	57 mm rocket
S-8		Soviet Union	80 mm rocket
S-13		Soviet Union	122 mm rocket
S-24		Soviet Union	240 mm rocket
S-25		Soviet Union	340 mm rocket
Machine guns and autocannons
Afanasev A-12.7		Soviet Union	Mounted on Mil Mi-24 and Mil Mi-8 helicopters.
YakB-12.7 machine gun		Soviet Union	Mounted on Mil Mi-24.
Gryazev-Shipunov GSh-30-2		Soviet Union	Mounted on Mi-24P and Sukhoi Su-25.
M134 Minigun		United States	Used on Bell UH-1 Iroquois and Mil 8 helicopters. UH64

== Uniforms ==
Name	Photo	Origin	Notes
MultiCam		United States; Georgia	Standard issue camouflage, produced domestically. Slightly altered variant.
MARPAT		United States; Georgia	Former standard-issue camouflage, limited use by now.
U.S. Woodland		United States	Used partially for recruits and by special operations groups.
Universal Camouflage Pattern		United States	Mainly used by special operations forces.
Desert Camouflage Uniform		United States	Used by Georgian contingents in Iraq and Afghanistan. Limited use by special operations forces.
Flecktarn		Germany	Was used by Georgian forces in Kosovo.

== Personal equipment ==
Name	Photo	Origin	Notes
Ballistic helmet DH MK-I		Georgia	Standard issue ballistic helmet of the Defense Forces. Provides protection in accordance to NIJ 01.01.04 IIIA (Level IIIA).
Tactical ballistic helmet DH MK-II		Georgia	Standard issue ballistic helmet of the Defense Forces. Provides protection in accordance to NIJ 01.01.04 IIIA (Level IIIA).
Tactical ballistic helmet DH MK-III		Georgia	FAST type ballistic helmet issued mainly to special operations forces and reconnaissance units. Provides protection in accordance to NIJ 01.01.04 IIIA (Level IIIA).
Modular tactical vest MK-I		Georgia	Standard issue body armor of the military. The vest itself can provide protection against small arms fire in accordance to Type IIIA NIJ-Std 0101.06 (Level IIIA) without plates. In the process of being replaced by the MK-V vest and MK-VII series tactical plate carriers.
Modular tactical vest Mk-II		Georgia	Armored tactical plate carrier used by peacekeeping forces primarily. The carrier itself can protect against small arms fire in accordance to Type IIIA NIJ-Std 0101.06 (Level IIIA) without plates.
Modular tactical vest MK-V		Georgia	General purpose bullet resistant modular body armor. The vest itself can protect against small arms fire in accordance to Type IIIA NIJ-Std 0101.06 (Level IIIA) without plates.
Modular plate carrier Mk-VII mod I		Georgia	Armored tactical slab-carry armor used by regular and special operations forces. The carrier itself can protect against small arms fire in accordance to Type IIIA NIJ-Std 0101.06 (Level IIIA) without plates.
Personnel Armor System for Ground Troops		United States; Georgia	Former standard-issue helmets and vests used in the early 2000s. Helmets were initially mostly provided by foreign countries. Subsequently, a domestic variant was introduced. Eventually the PASGT was replaced by DELTA DH MK-I and DH MK-II ballistic helmets as well as MK-I and MK-II series vests. Some are still in use.
Advanced Combat Helmet		United States	Formerly used by ground troops and peacekeepers, replaced by DELTA DH MK-I and DH MK-II ballistic helmets.
Interceptor body armor		United States	Were issued mainly for peacekeeping operations in Iraq and Afghanistan and also used by engineer troops. Replaced by DELTA MK-I and MK-II series vests.
Eagle Industries multi-mission armor carrier		USA	Modular plate carrier used by special operations forces.
NBC suit		United States; Georgia	Used for CBRN threats.

== Other equipment ==
Name	Type	Photo	Origin	Notes
Steiner Military 8×30 R	Binoculars		Germany	
Safran Vectronix VECTOR 21	Laser Rangefinder		Switzerland	
Safran Vectronix VECTOR 23	Laser Rangefinder		Switzerland	
PSO-1	Telescopic sight		Soviet Union	Mounted on SVD sniper rifles.
Aimpoint CompM4	Telescopic sight		Sweden	Used on M4 carbine and Heckler & Koch MP5 submachine guns, SOF members use Aimponts on AK rifles as well.
Advanced Combat Optical Gunsight	Telescopic sight		United States	Used on M4 carbine and M240 machine guns.
AN/PRC-119	Combat radio		United States	
AN/PRC-152	Combat radio		United States	
3M Peltor ComTac	Headphone		United States	Used mainly by special operations, intelligence and reconnaissance forces.
PGO-7	Telescopic sight		Soviet Union	Used on RPG-7.
AN/PEQ-2	Laser sight		United States	Mostly used on M4 type carbines.
AN/PEQ-15	Laser sight		United States	Mostly used on M4 type carbines.
EOTech	Holographic weapon sight		United States	EOTech EXPS3 produced under license by DELTA as HWS-01.
1PN51	Night-vision device		Soviet Union	Used on VSS and AK-74 rifles.
1PN51-2	Night-vision device		Soviet Union	
1PN58	Night-vision device		Soviet Union	
AN/PVS-14	Night-vision device		United States	
AN/PVS-7	Night-vision device		United States	Standard issue night vision goggles, used by ground troops
Cammenga compass	Lensatic compass		United States	
Fulton MX991/U	Flashlight		United States	
6H4 Bayonet	Bayonet		Soviet Union	Used on AKM and AK-74 rifles.
NRS-2	Survival knife		Soviet Union	Used by special operations forces.
M9 bayonet	Bayonet		United States	Used on M4 rifles.
Ka-Bar	Combat knife		United States	Mainly use by special operations forces.
Dräger LAR VI.1	Rebreather		Germany	Used by rescue swimmers, combat swimmers and frogmen
TAC-100A	Diver Navigation Board		United States	Used by combat swimmers and frogmen
T-10D	Parachute		United States	Used by special operations forces
3M SCBA	Gas mask		United States	Used mainly by Engineer troops against CBRN threats.
PAB-2	Artillery circumferentor		Soviet Union	Used by artillery troops.
MILES	Military laser		United States	Used for training purposes.
PBS-1 Suppressor	Suppressor		Soviet Union	Mainly used by special operations forces, mounted on AKM rifles.
STANAG magazine	Magazine		United States	Used on M4 rifles and Negev machine guns.
M192 Lightweight Ground Mount	Tripod		United States	Used for M240 machine guns.
Mine detector	Metal detector		United States	

== See also ==
- List of former equipment of the Georgian Armed Forces
- List of equipment of the Azerbaijani Land Forces
