= 1PN51-2 =

Soviet night scope for RPG-29

1PN51-2 (Russian: 1ПН51-2) is the GRAU index for a Soviet designed passive night scope for the RPG-29 rocket launcher. 1PN is the GRAU index of night vision devices, where PN stands for Nochnoy Pritsel (Russian: Ночной прицел) meaning night sight.

The scope weighs 2.1 kg and measures 280 mm × 192 mm × 106 mm (length × height × width). It is thus more compact than the similar multi-model 1PN51 night vision scope.

It is attached onto a matching side rail on the RPG after which a lever on the scope is pressed to hold it in place.

It comes in a metal container with room for extra batteries, battery charger and the other accessories, weighing 6.45 kg in total.

== Optics ==
The scope gathers light via an 80 mm aperture into a reflector with the secondary mirror obscuring the central 42 mm of the aperture.

The top of the scope has two perpendicular knobs for zeroing the sight.

The aperture cover itself has two 12 mm apertures that can be opened partially allowing the scope to be used in light conditions that would otherwise saturate the light intensifier.

The rear end of the scope is a focus dial.

The eyepiece has a detachable soft rubber eyecup.

The scope has a magnification of 2.94.

== Light Intensifier and Reticle ==
Below the aperture the device has a brightness knob. Apart from powering on and off the device, this knob controls the brightness of the reticle allowing for the reticle to be visible without outshining the target.

The reticle has markings that match the height of a typical armoured vehicle at ranges 200 m, 300 m, 400 m and 500 m.

== Power ==
The light intensifier is powered by a pack of 5 D-0,55S (Russian: Д-0,55С) rechargeable cells, providing up to 7 V. The scope requires 6 V ± 1 V. The maximum current drawn is 40 mA.

The D-0,55S battery pack is used by a range of devices including 1PN51 and 1PN58 and has a separate charging device. The charging device has a switch to select one of 12 V or 27 V input and two red control lamps, one to indicate that power is available and one to indicate that charging is complete.

== Image gallery ==
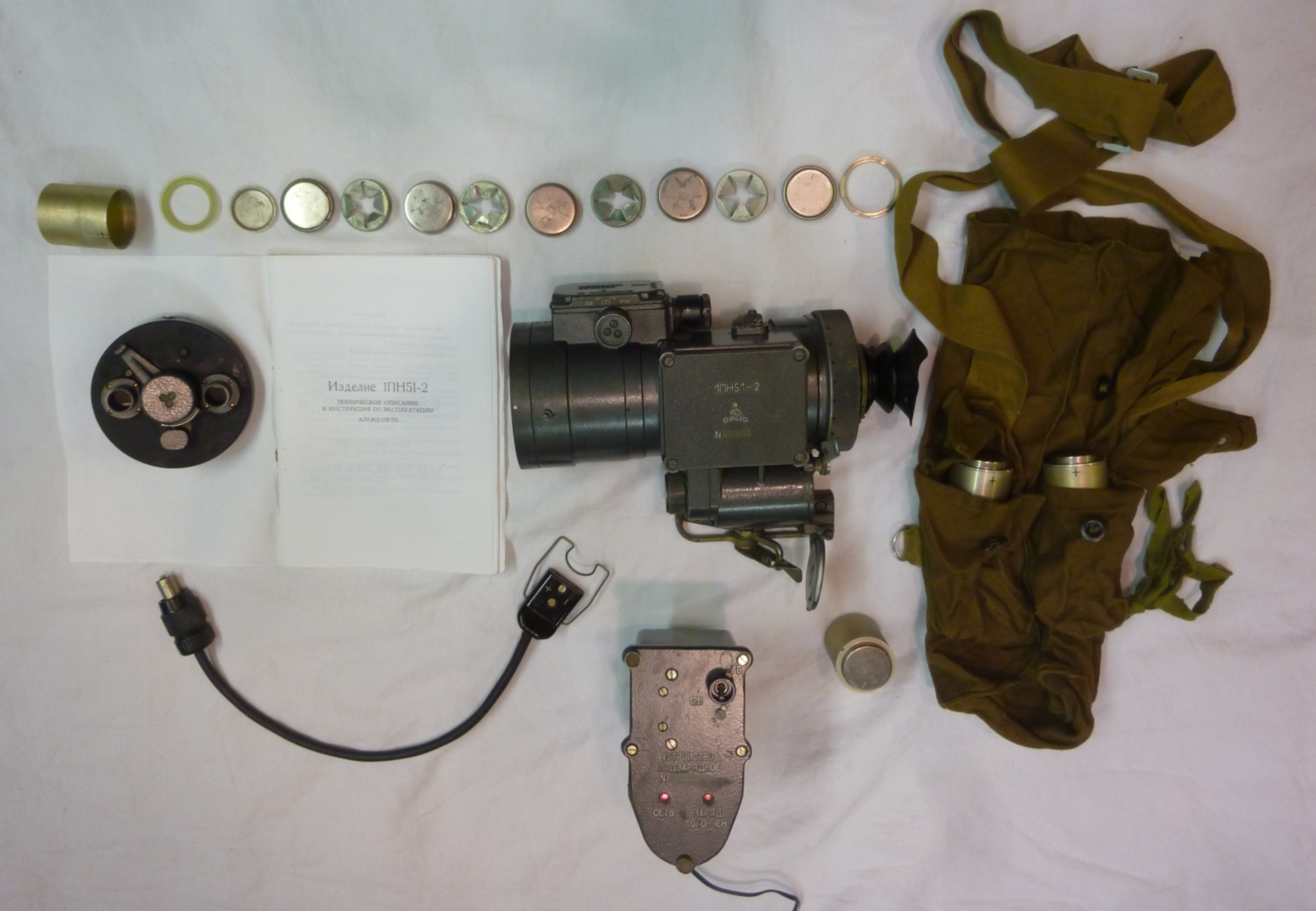
A 1PN51-2 with bag, manual, battery packs (one disassembled), battery charger w. cable

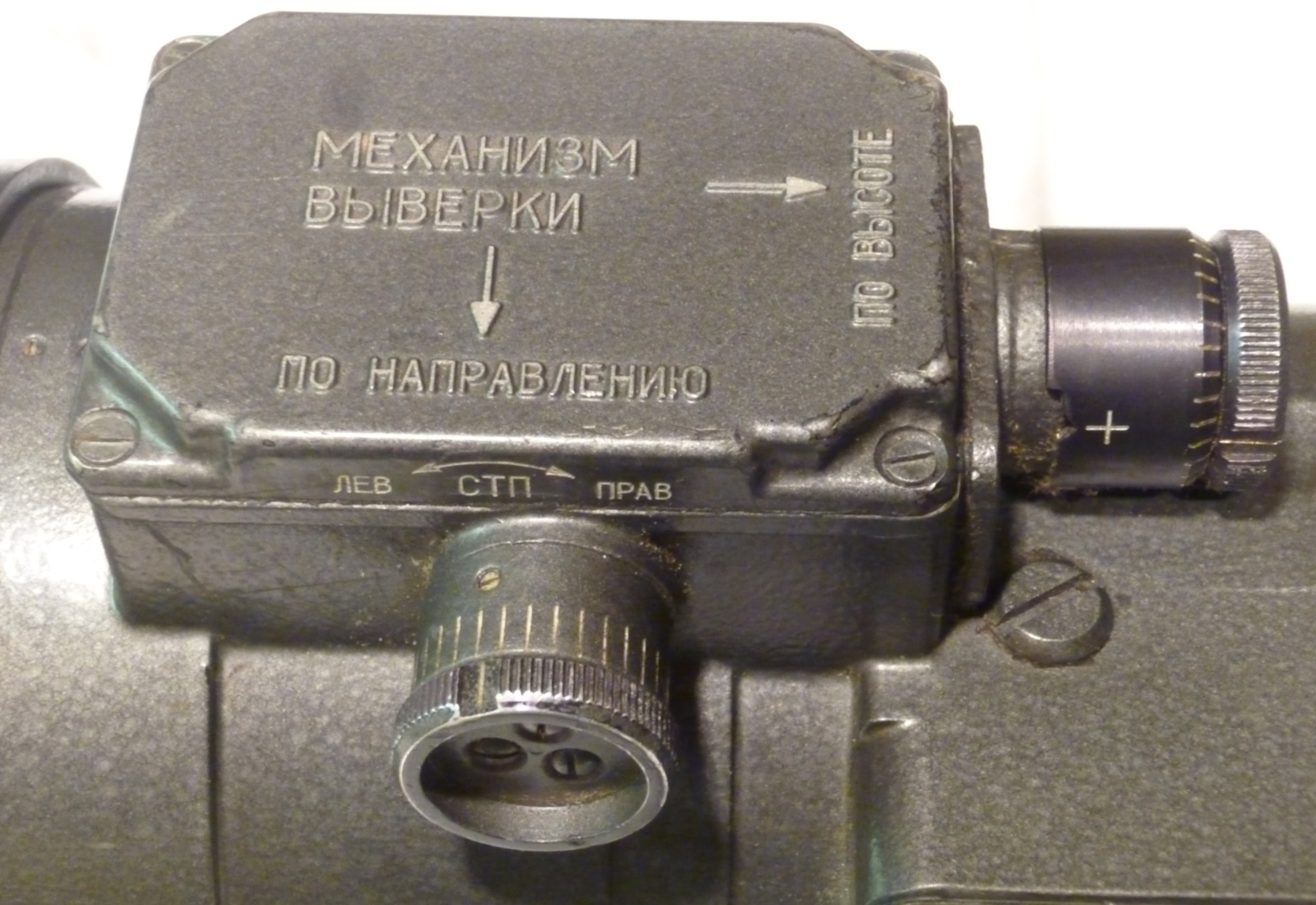
The two knobs for zeroing a 1PN51-2

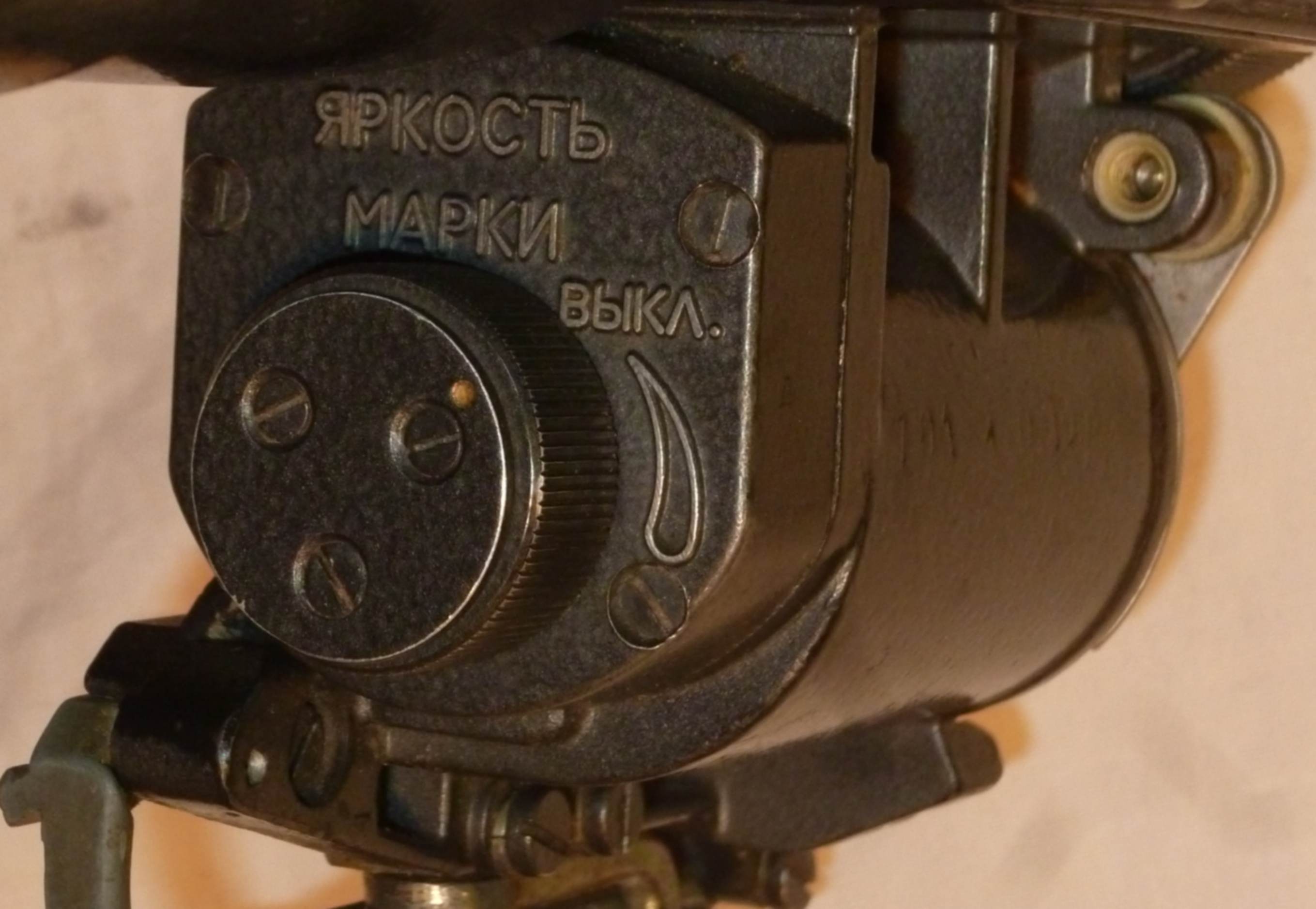
The knob for controlling the 1PN51-2 reticle brightness

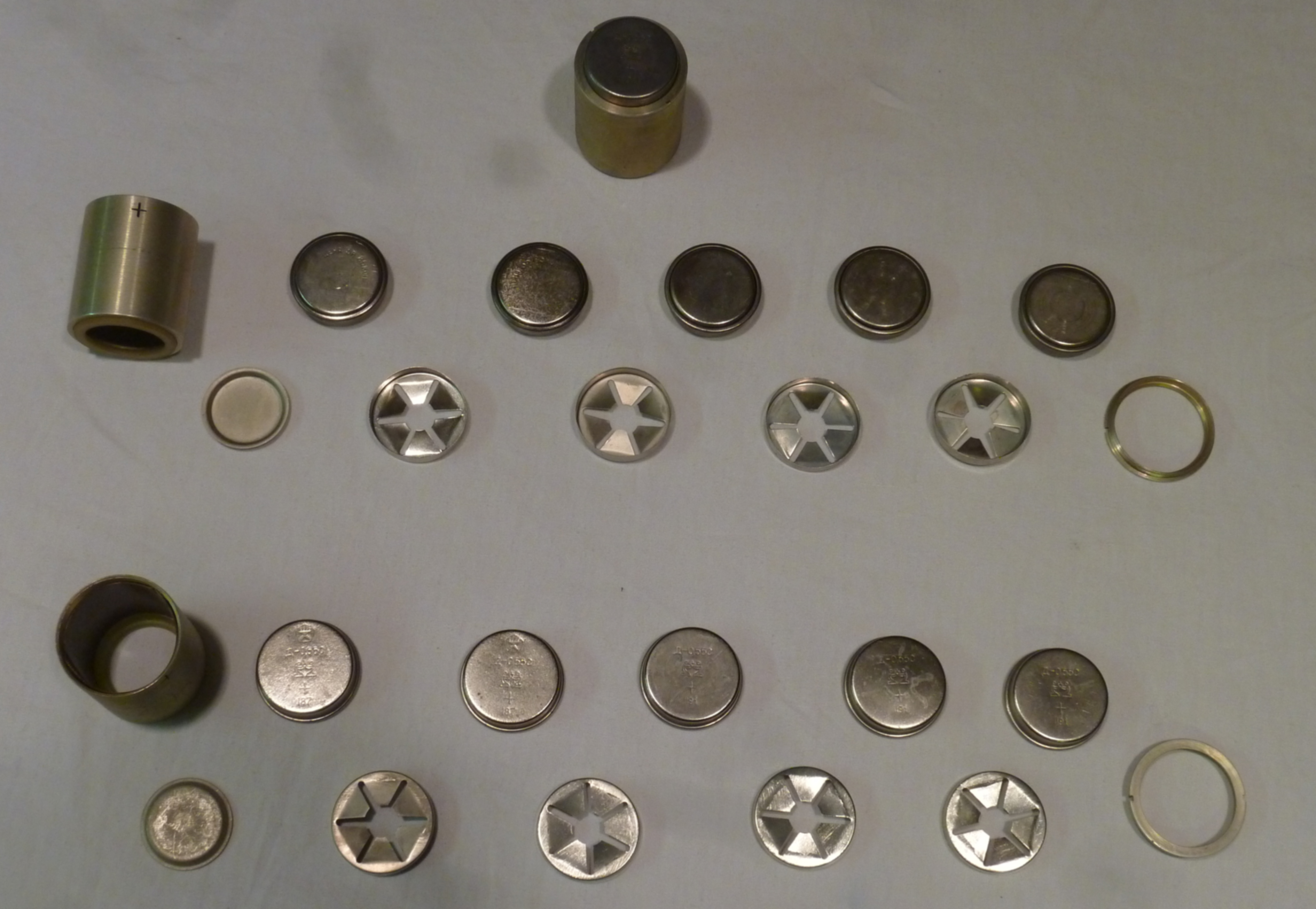
Three battery packs for the 1PN51-2, two of which are disassembled

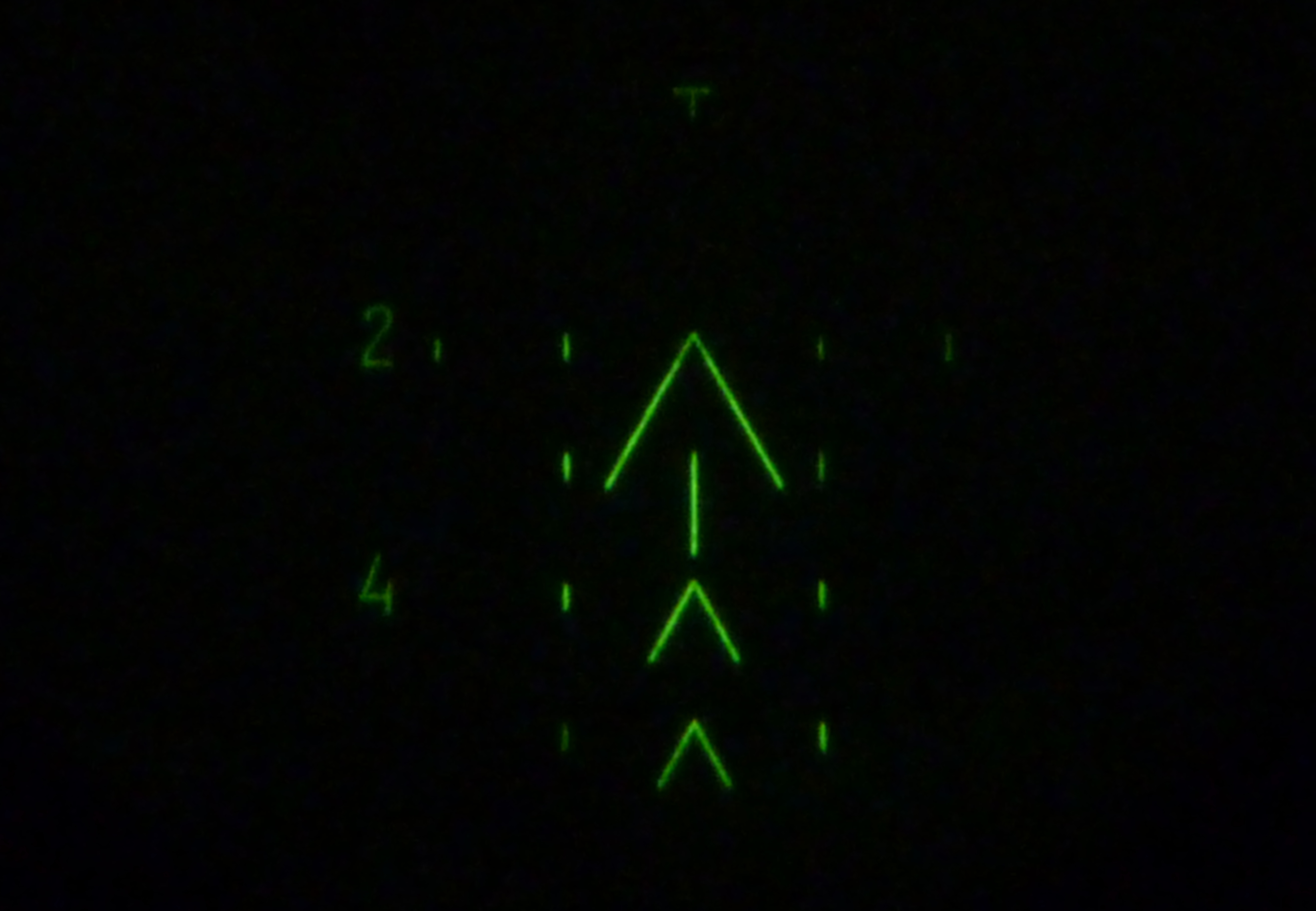
The 1PN51-2 Reticle
