= Night-vision device =

Device that lets the user see in levels of visible light approaching total darkness

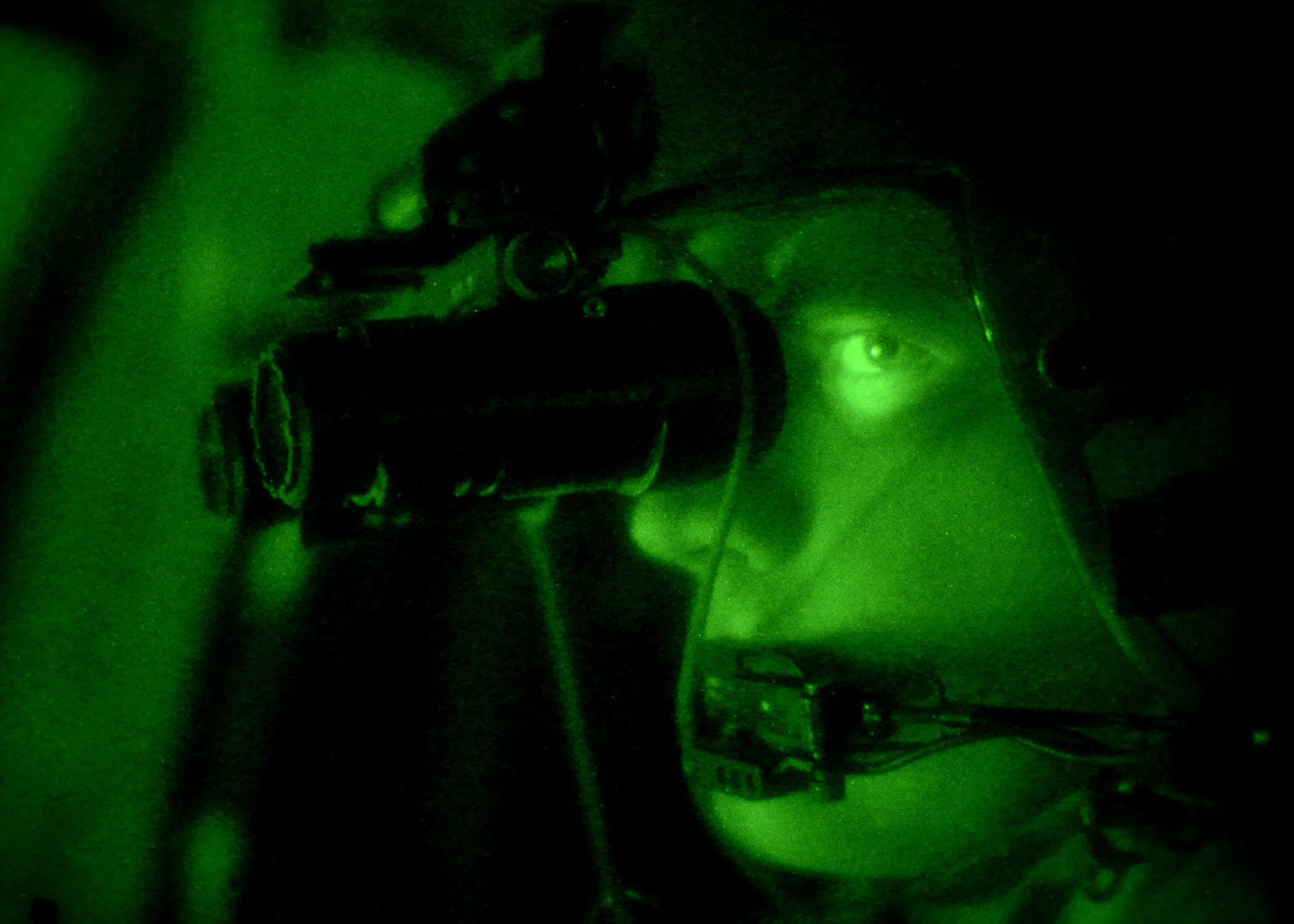
A US Navy aviator uses a pair of helmet-mounted AN/AVS-6 vision goggles. The effect on the natural night vision of the eye is evident

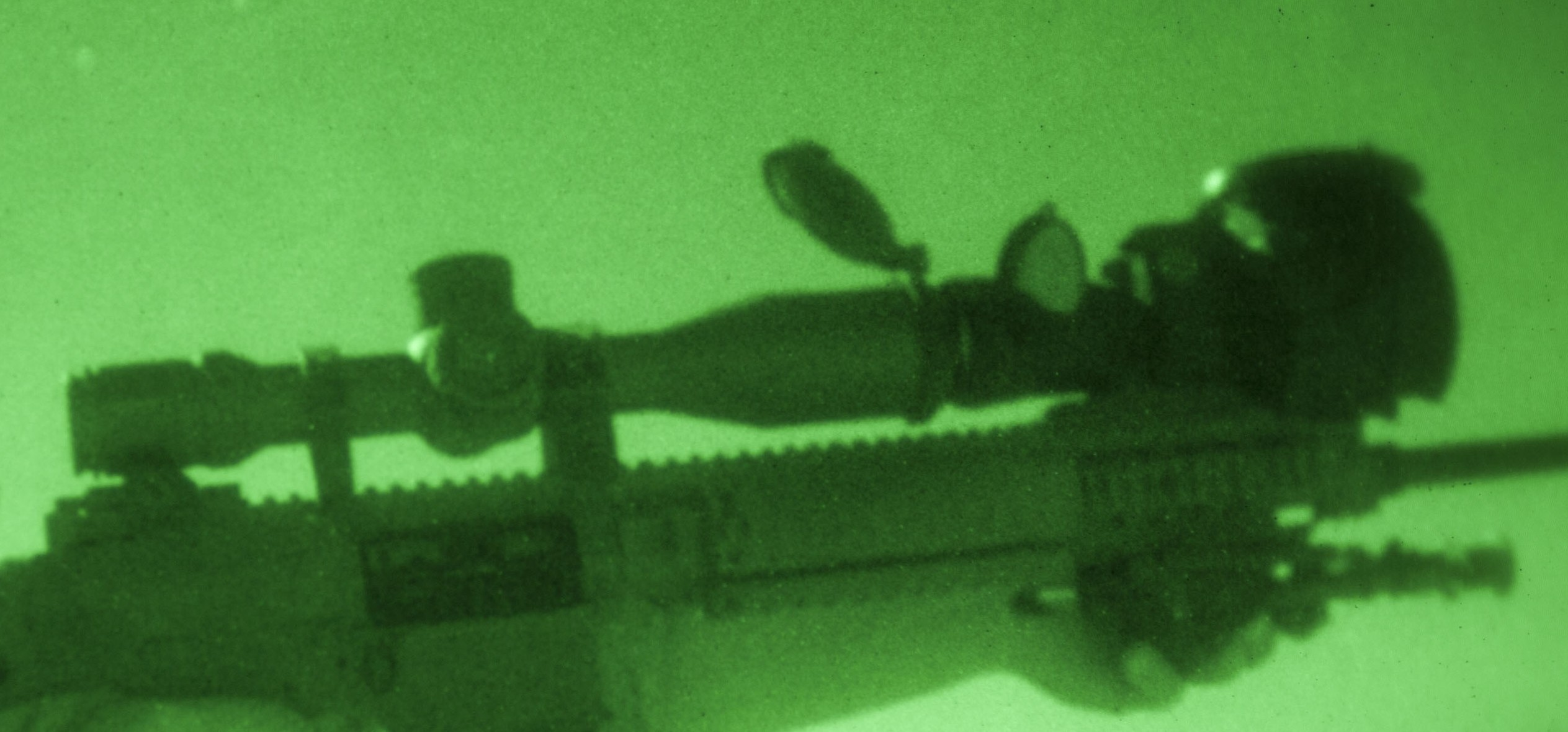
A standard telescopic sight augmented with a night-vision device in front on the M110. Note that in addition to the image intensifier, the NVD gathers much more light by its much larger aperture

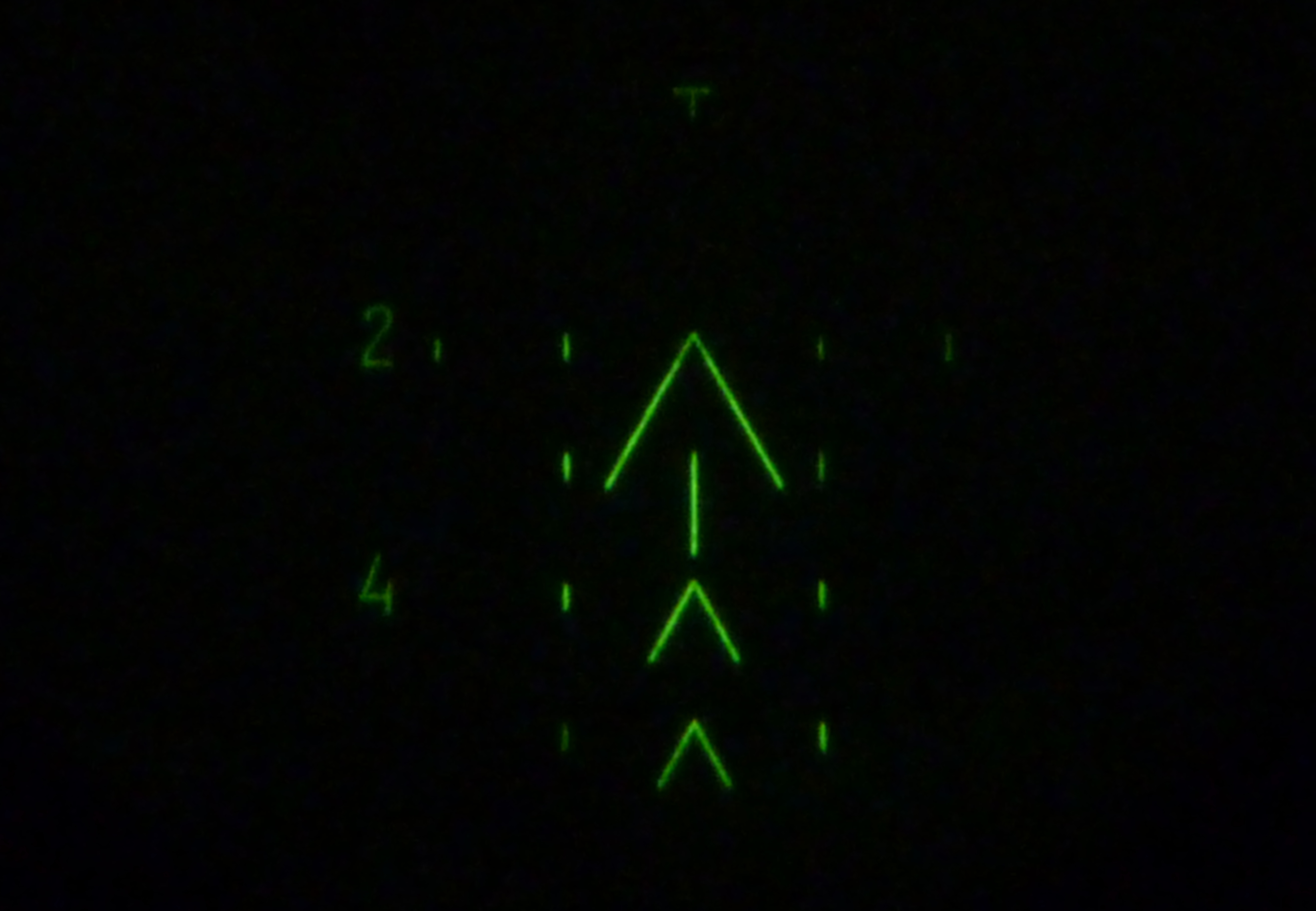
A 1PN51-2 night-vision reticle with markings for range estimation

First-person view through night-vision goggles of the FBI Hostage Rescue Team using an airboat.

A night-vision device (NVD), also known as a night optical/observation device (NOD) or night-vision goggle (NVG), is an optoelectronic device that allows visualization of images in low levels of light, improving the user's night vision.

The device enhances ambient visible light and converts near-infrared light into visible light which can then be seen by humans; this is known as I^{2} (image intensification). By comparison, viewing of infrared thermal radiation is referred to as thermal imaging and operates in a different section of the infrared spectrum.

A night vision device usually consists of an image intensifier tube, a protective housing, and an optional mounting system. Many NVDs also include a protective sacrificial lens, mounted over the front/objective lens to prevent damage by environmental hazards, while some incorporate telescopic lenses. An NVD image is typically monochrome green, as green was considered to be the easiest color to see for prolonged periods in the dark. Night vision devices may be passive, relying solely on ambient light, or may be active, using an IR (infrared) illuminator.

Night vision devices may be handheld or attach to helmets. When used with firearms, an IR laser sight is often mounted to the weapon. The laser sight produces an infrared beam that is visible only through an NVD and aids with aiming. Some night vision devices are made to be mounted to firearms. These can be used in conjunction with weapon sights or standalone; some thermal weapon sights have been designed to provide similar capabilities.

These devices were first used for night combat in World War II and came into wide use during the Vietnam War. The technology has evolved since then, involving "generations" of night-vision equipment with performance increases and price reductions. Consequently, though they are commonly used by military and law enforcement agencies, night vision devices are available to civilian users for applications including aviation, driving, and demining. The global market for night-vision devices was valued at approximately US$7.5 billion in 2024 and is projected to reach US$9.5 billion by 2030.

== History ==
In 1929 Hungarian physicist Kálmán Tihanyi invented an infrared-sensitive electronic television camera for anti-aircraft defense in the UK. Night vision technology prior to the end of World War II was later described as Generation 0.

Night-vision devices were introduced in the German Army as early as 1939 and were used in World War II. AEG started developing its first devices in 1935. In mid-1943, the German Army began testing infrared night-vision devices and telescopic rangefinders mounted on Panther tanks. Two arrangements were constructed. The Sperber FG 1250 ("Sparrow Hawk"), with a range of up to 600 metres (2,000 ft), had a 30-centimetre (12 in) infrared searchlight and an image converter operated by the tank commander.

From late 1944 to March 1945 the German military conducted successful tests of FG 1250 sets mounted on Panther Ausf. G tanks (and other variants). During the war, approximately 50 (or 63) Panthers were equipped with the FG 1250 and saw combat on both the Eastern and Western Fronts. The "Vampir" man-portable system for infantry was used with StG 44 assault rifles.

Parallel development occurred in the US. The M1 and M3 infrared night-sighting devices, also known as the "sniperscope" or "snooperscope", saw limited service with the US Army in World War II and in the Korean War, to assist snipers. These were active devices, using an infrared light source to illuminate targets. Their image-intensifier tubes used an anode and an S-1 photocathode, made primarily of silver, cesium, and oxygen, the image was inverted electrostatically and electron acceleration produced gain.

An experimental Soviet device called the PAU-2 was field-tested in 1942.

In 1938 the British Admiralty assumed responsibility for British military infra-red research. They worked with Philips until the fall of the Netherlands, then with Philips' UK subsidiary Radio Transmission Equipment Ltd., and finally with EMI, who in early 1941 provided compact, lightweight image converter tubes. By July 1942 the British had produced a binocular apparatus called 'Design E'. This was bulky, needing an external power pack generating 7,000 volts, but saw limited use with amphibious vehicles of 79th Armoured Division in the 1945 crossing of the Rhine. Between May and June 1943, 43rd (Wessex) Infantry Division trialled man-portable night vision sets, and the British later experimented with mounting the devices to Mark III and Mark II(S) Sten submachine guns. However, by January 1945 the British had only made seven infra-red receiver sets. Although some were sent to India and Australia for trials before the end of 1945, by the Korean War and Malayan Emergency the British were using night vision equipment supplied by the United States.

Early examples include:

- FG 1250 Sperber
- ZG 1229 Vampir
- PAU-2
- PNV-57A tanker goggles
- SU-49/PAS-5
- T-120 Sniperscope, 1st model (World War II)
- M2 Sniperscope, 2nd model (World War II)
- M3 Sniperscope, 4th model (Korean War)
- AN/PAS-4 (early Vietnam War)

After World War II, Vladimir K. Zworykin developed the first practical commercial night-vision device at Radio Corporation of America, intended for civilian use. Zworykin's idea came from a former radio-guided missile. At that time, infrared was commonly called black light, a term later restricted to ultraviolet. Zworykin's invention was not a success due to its large size and high cost.

=== United States ===
==== Generation 1 ====
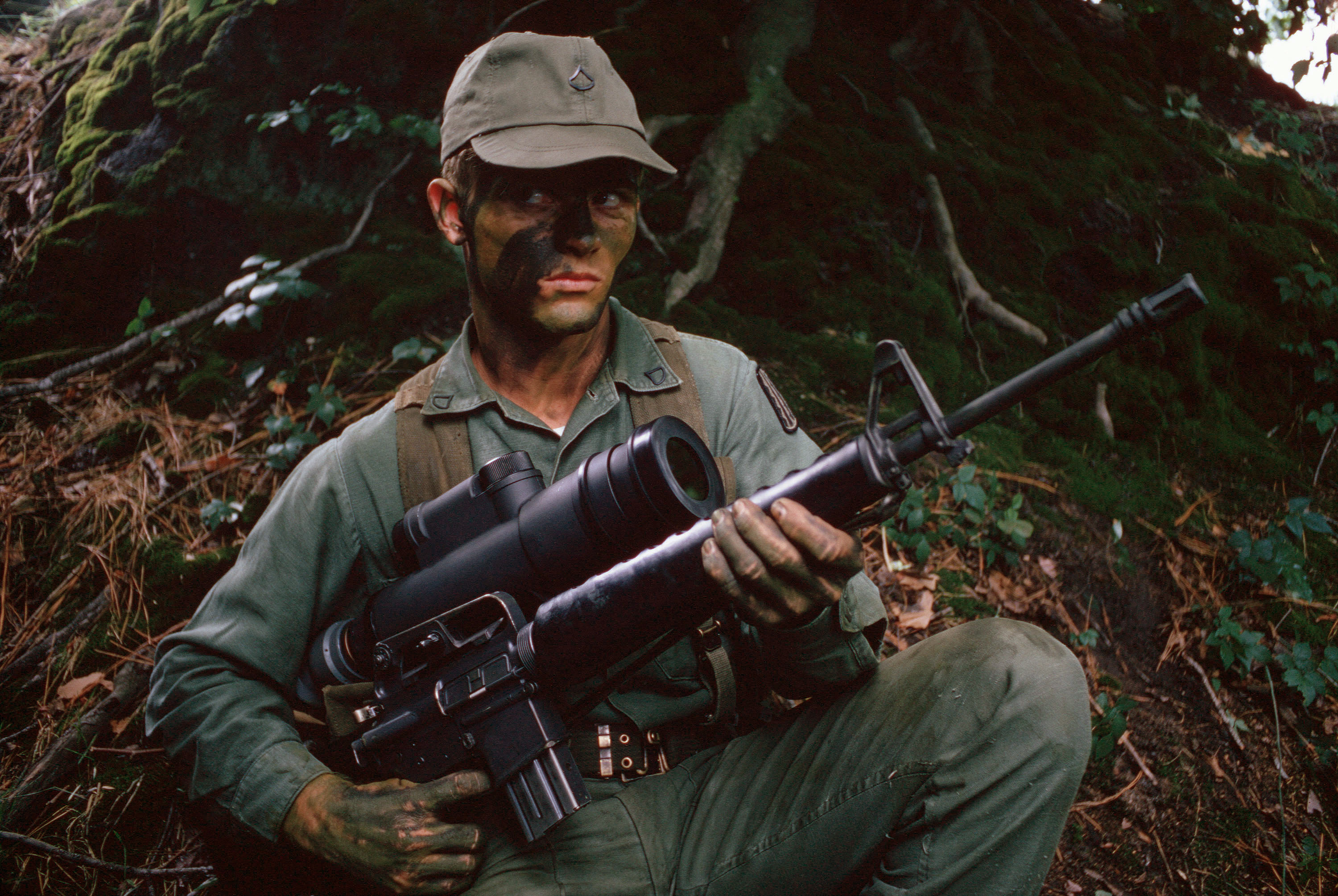
An M16A1 rifle fitted with the AN/PVS-2 Starlight scope

First-generation passive devices developed by the US Army in the 1960s were introduced during the Vietnam War. They were an adaptation of earlier active technology and relied on ambient light instead of using an extra infrared light source. Using an S-20 photocathode, their image intensifiers amplified light around 1,000-fold, but they were quite bulky and required moonlight to function properly.

Examples:

- AN/PVS-1 Starlight scope
- AN/PVS-2 Starlight scope
- AN/PAS-6 Varo Metascope

==== Generation 2 ====
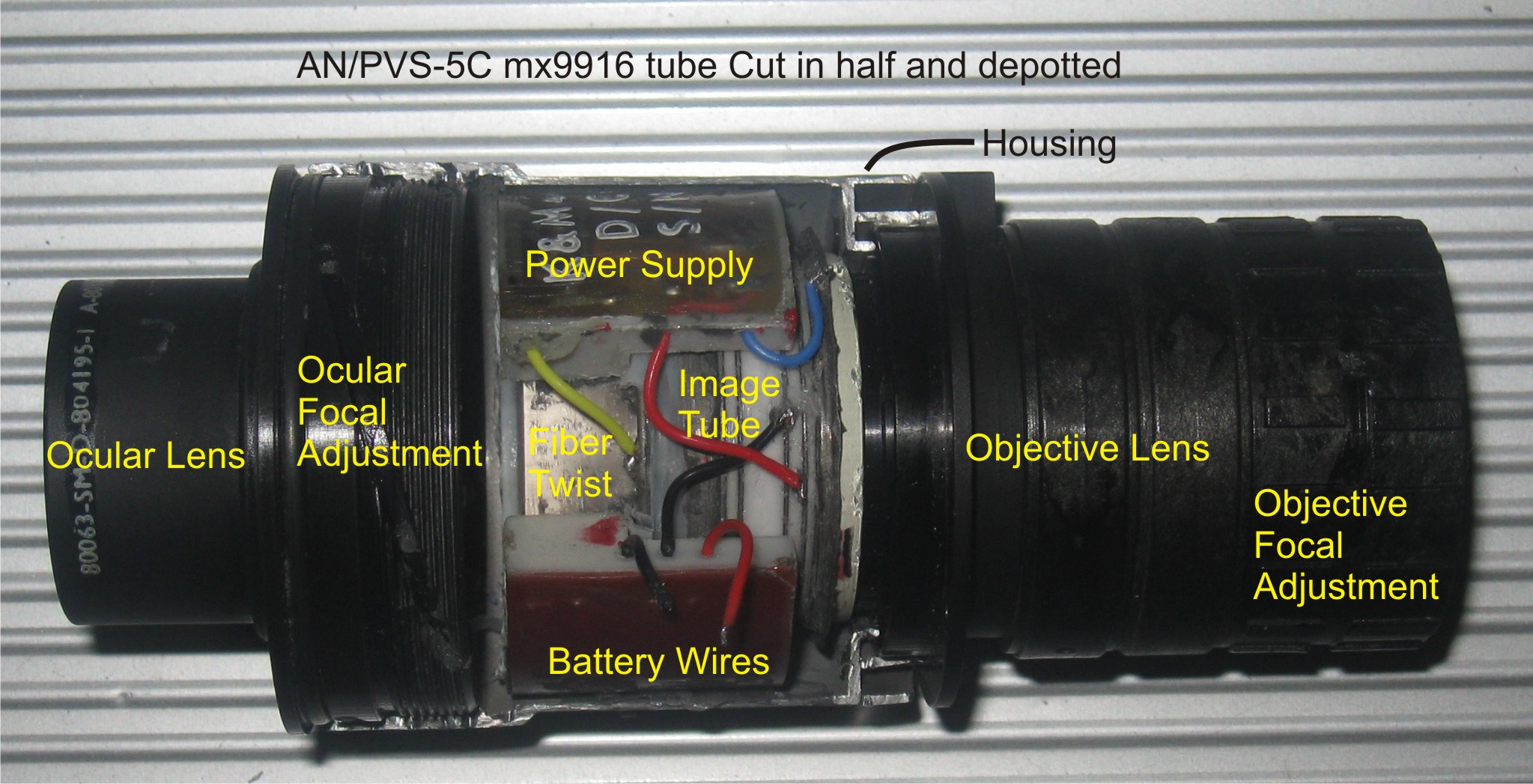
A cut-open and depotted AN/PVS-5, showing the components of a night-vision device. This device was manufactured in 2nd generation (5A to 5C) and 3rd generation (5D)

1970s second-generation devices featured an improved image-intensifier tube using a micro-channel plate (MCP) with an S-25 photocathode. This produced a much brighter image, especially around the edges of the lens. This led to increased clarity in low ambient-light environments, such as moonless nights. Light amplification was around 20,000. Image resolution and reliability improved.

Examples:

- AN/PVS-3 Miniaturized night vision sight
- AN/PVS-4
- AN/PVS-5
- SUPERGEN

Later advances brought GEN II+ devices (equipped with better optics, SUPERGEN tubes, improved resolution and better signal-to-noise ratios), though the label is not formally recognized by the NVESD.

==== Generation 3 ====
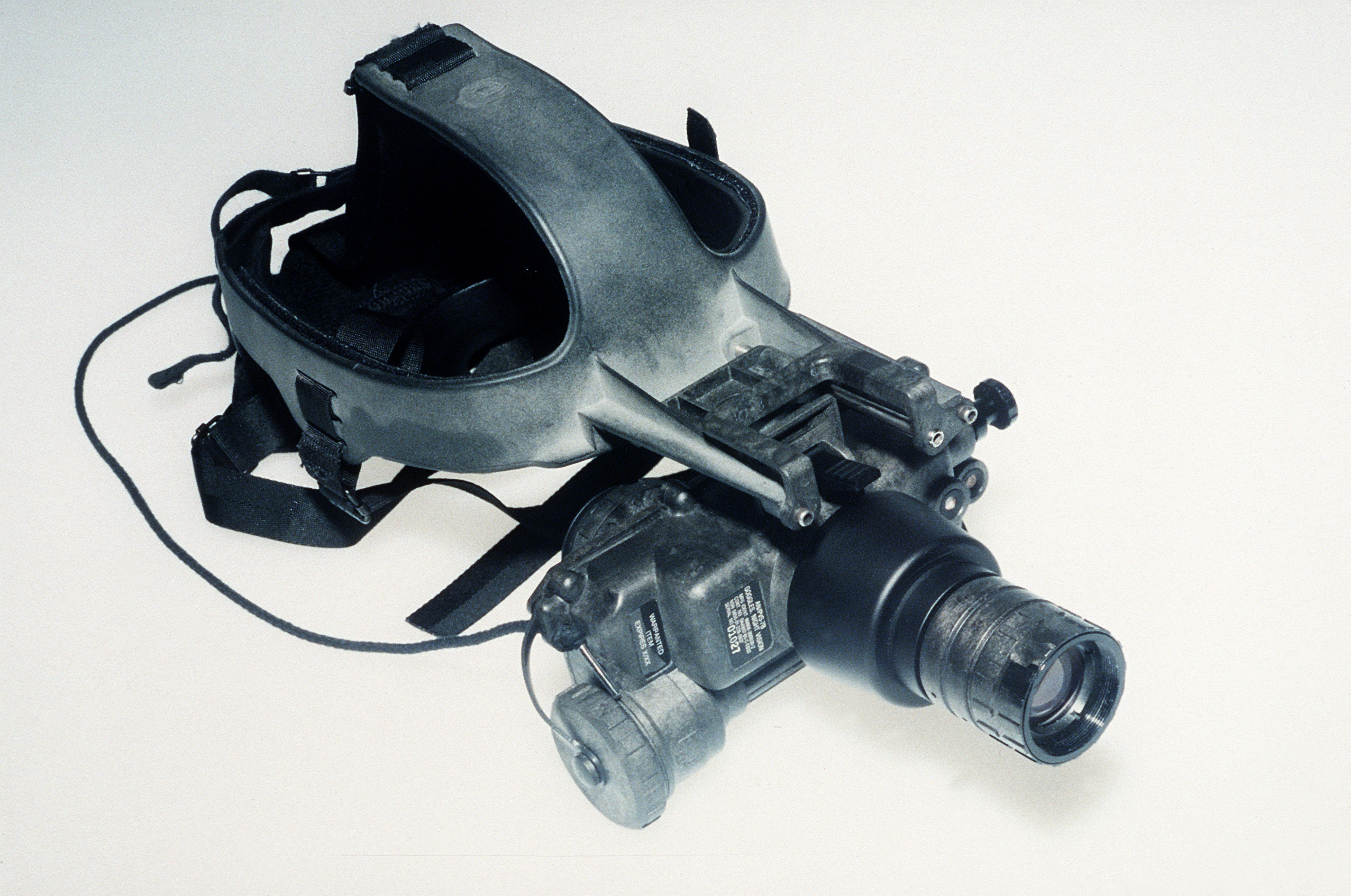
An early development version of the AN/PVS-7b goggle

Third-generation night-vision systems, developed in the late 1980s, maintained the MCP from Gen II, but used a gallium arsenide (GaAs) photocathode, with improved resolution. GaAs photocathodes are primarily manufactured by L3Harris Technologies and Elbit Systems of America and imaged light from 500–900 nm (blue-green to near infrared). In addition, the MCP was coated with an ion barrier film to increase tube life. However, the ion barrier allowed fewer electrons to pass through. The ion barrier increased the "halo" effect around bright spots or light sources. Because of those negative effects the ion barriers on newer tubes were made significantly thinner. Light amplification (and power consumption) with these devices improved to around 30,000–50,000 fL/fc.

Examples:

- AN/PVS-7
- AN/NVS-7
- AN/PVS-10
- AN/PVS-14
- AN/PVS-17
- CNVS-4949
- PN-21K
- AGM UNVG-RPO

==== Auto-gating ====
Autogating (ATG) rapidly switches the power supply's voltage to the photocathode on and off. These switches are rapid enough that they are not detectable to the human eye and peak voltage supplied to the night vision device is maintained. This reduces the "duty cycle" (ie. the amount of time that the tube has power running through it) in high light conditions which increases the device's lifespan and lets it maintain resolution better. Autogating also enhances the Bright-Source Protection (BSP), which reduces the voltage supplied to the photocathode in response to ambient light levels. Automatic Brightness Control (ABC) modulates the amount of voltage supplied to the microchannel plate (rather than the photocathode) in response to ambient light. Together, BSP and ABC (alongside autogating) serves to prevent damage to the tube when the night vision device is exposed to sudden bright sources of light, like a muzzle flash or artificial lighting. These modulation systems also help maintain a steady illumination level in the user's view that improves the ability to keep "eyes on target" in spite of temporary light flashes. These functions are especially useful for pilots, soldiers in urban environments, and special operations forces who may be exposed to rapidly changing light levels.

==== Generation 3+ ====
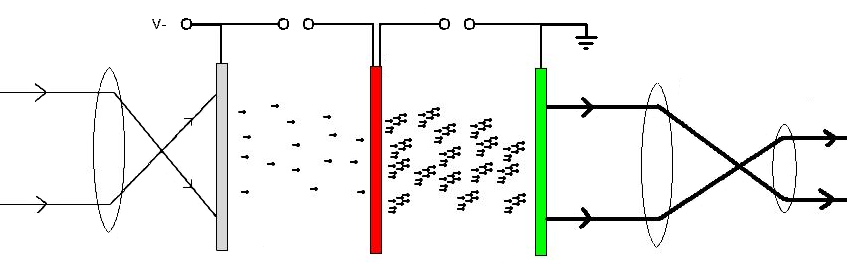
Generation II, III and IV devices use a microchannel plate for amplification. Photons from a dimly lit source enter the objective lens (on the left) and strike the photocathode (gray plate). The photocathode (which is negatively biased) releases electrons, which are accelerated to the higher-voltage microchannel plate (red). Each electron causes multiple electrons to be released from the microchannel plate. The electrons are drawn to the higher-voltage phosphor screen (green). Electrons that strike the phosphor screen cause the phosphor to produce photons of light viewable through the eyepiece lenses.

OMNI, or OMNIBUS, refers to a series of contracts through which the US Army purchased GEN III night vision devices. This started with OMNI I, which procured AN/PVS-7A and AN/PVS-7B devices, then continued with OMNI II (1990), OMNI III (1992), OMNI IV (1996), OMNI V (1998), OMNI VI (2002), OMNI VII (2005), OMNI VIII, and OMNI IX. In April 2024, the US Army awarded L3Harris a $263 million production order for the ENVG-B under a program of record expected to total nearly $1 billion over ten years, and in December 2025 L3Harris and Palantir announced a partnership applying data analytics to improve night-vision production.

However, OMNI is not a specification. The performance of a particular device generally depends upon the tube which is used. For example, a GEN III OMNI III MX-10160A/AVS-6 tube performs similarly to a GEN III OMNI VII MX-10160A/AVS-6 tube, even though the former was manufactured in ~1992 and the latter ~2005.

One particular technology, PINNACLE is a proprietary thin-film microchannel plate technology created by ITT that was included in the OMNI VII contract. The thin-film improves performance.

GEN III OMNI V–IX devices developed in the 2000s and onward can differ from earlier devices in important ways:

- An automatic gated power supply system regulates the photocathode voltage, allowing the NVD to instantaneously adapt to changing light conditions.
- A removed or greatly thinned ion barrier that decreases the number of electrons that are rejected by GEN III MCP, hence resulting in less image noise. The disadvantage to a thin or removed ion barrier is the overall decrease in tube life from a theoretical 20,000 h mean time to failure (MTTF) for standard Gen III type, to 15,000 h MTTF for thin film types. This loss is largely negated by the low number of image-intensifier tubes that reach 15,000 h of operation before requiring replacement.

The consumer market sometimes classifies such systems as Generation 4, and the United States military describes these systems as Generation 3 autogated tubes (GEN III OMNI V-IX). Moreover, as autogating power supplies can be added to any previous generation of night-vision devices, autogating capability does not automatically put the devices in a particular OMNI classification. Any postnominals appearing after a generation type (i.e., Gen II+, Gen III+) indicate improvement(s) over the original specification's requirements.

Examples:

- AN/PVS-14
- AN/PVS-22
- NVS-22
- Binocular Night Vision Device (BNVD) (AN/PVS-15, AN/PVS-21, AN/PVS-23, AN/PVS-31A/D)
- Ground Panoramic Night Vision Goggle (GPNVG-18)

== Figure of merit ==
Figure of merit (FoM) is a rough quantitative Figure of a NVD's effectiveness and clarity. It is calculated using the number of line pairs per millimeter that a user can detect multiplied by the image intensifier's signal-to-noise ratio (SNR).

In the late 1990s, innovations in photocathode, power supply and microchannel plate (MCP) technology significantly increased the SNR.

By 2001, the United States federal government concluded that a tube's generation was not a determinant performance factor, obsoleting the term as a basis of export regulations.

The US government has recognized the fact that the technology itself makes little difference, as long as an operator can see clearly at night.

International Traffic in Arms Regulations specify that among other limitations gen2 and higher generation tubes with a luminous sensitivity greater than 350 μA/lm are not exportable. However, the Defense Technology Security Administration (DTSA) can waive that policy on a case-by-case basis.

== Fusion night vision ==
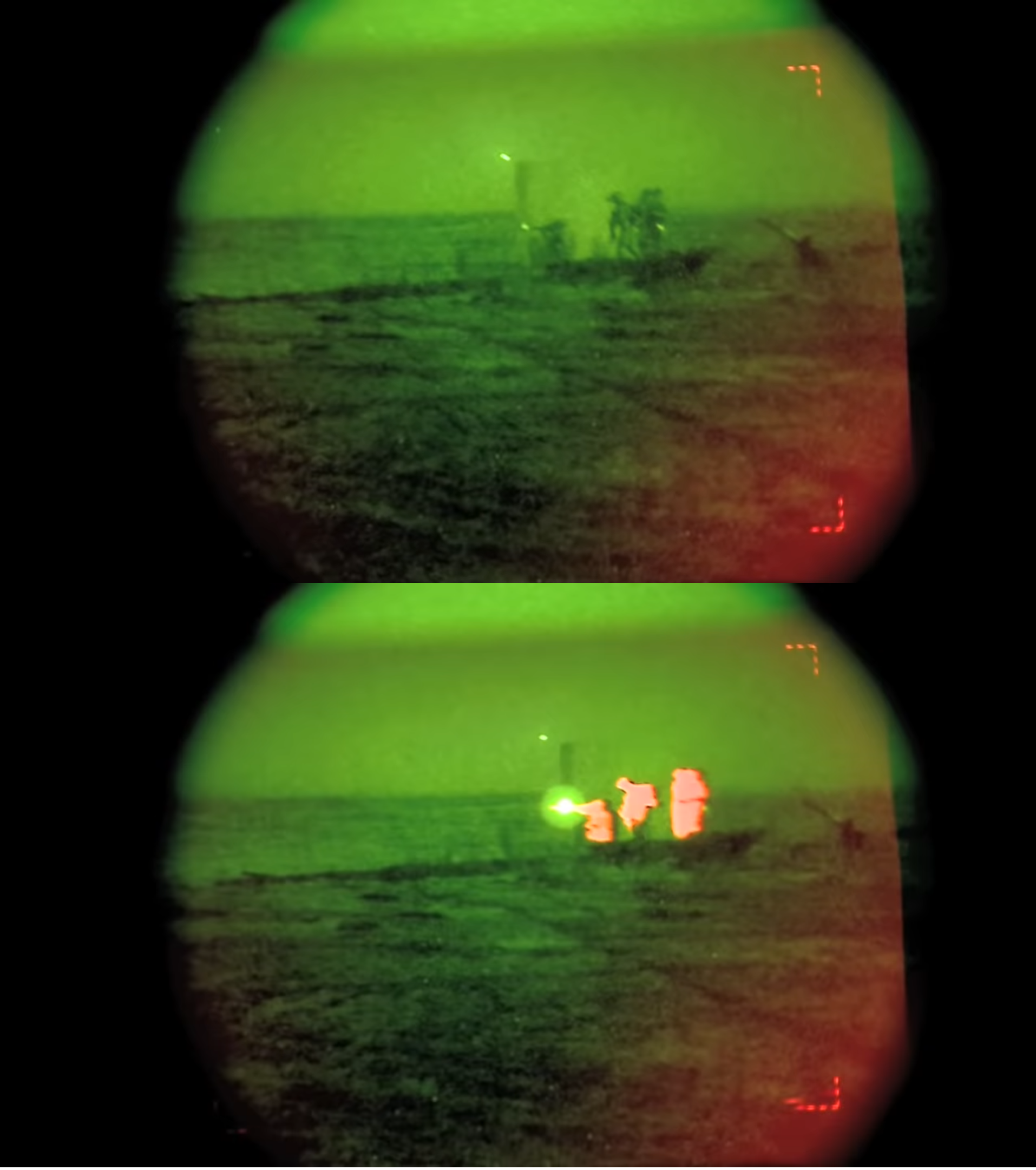
A comparison of I^{2} only night vision (above) and I^{2} plus thermal fusion (below)

Fusion night vision combines I^{2} (image intensification) with thermal imaging, which functions in the medium (MWIR 3–5 μm) and/or long (LWIR 8–14 μm) wavelength range. Initial models appeared in the 2000s. Dedicated fusion devices and clip-on imagers that add a thermal overlay to standard I^{2} night vision devices are available. Fusion combines excellent navigation and fine details (I^{2}), with easy heat signature detection (imaging).

Fusion modes include night vision with thermal overlay, night vision only, thermal only, and others such as outline (which outlines objects that have thermal signatures) or "decamouflage", which highlights all objects that are of near-human temperature. Fusion devices are heavier and more power hungry than I^{2}-only devices.

One alternative is to use an I^{2} device over one eye and a thermal device over the other eye, relying on the human visual system to provide a binocular combined view.

=== Examples ===
- AN/PSQ-20 ENVG (Enhanced Night Vision Goggles)
- AN/PSQ-36 FGE (Fusion Goggle Enhanced, previously FGS for Fusion Goggle System)
- AN/PSQ-42 ENVG-B (Enhanced Night Vision Goggles-Binocular)
- AN/PSQ-44 ENVG-B (Enhanced Night Vision Goggles-Binocular)
- AN/PAS-29 COTI/E-COTI: (Enhanced) Clip-On Thermal Imager

== Out of band ==
Out of Band (OOB) refers to night vision technologies that operate outside the 500-900 nm NIR (near infrared) frequency range. This is possible with dedicated image intensifier tubes or with clip-on devices.

=== Advantages ===
- OOB devices might see more on a starlit night because OOB devices intensify any ambient, UV, or SWIR light.
- OOB devices image 1064 nm light, which can help JTACs and other FACs when marking targets with a laser designator, which typically use 1064 nm light, which is barely visible to Gen III.
- OOB light is not visible to most commercial devices. Night vision has proliferated among countries such as Russia and China, and into the hands of armed groups such as the Taliban Red Unit. Friendly forces using night vision equipment such as IR illuminators, IR strobes, or IR lasers, can be spotted. OOB tech are much more difficult to spot with Gen III (depending on wavelength and intensity).
- OOB devices that operate in the 1550 nm range can perceive typical laser rangefinders.

=== Examples ===
Ground personnel, helmet-mounted imagers:

- Photonis 4G INTENS image intensifier tubes (350-1100 nm)
- Optics 1 AN/PAS-34 E-COSI (Enhanced Clip-On SWIR Imager) (900-1700 nm)
- Optics 1 COSMO (Clip-On SWIR Monocular)
- Photonis' 4G HyMa (Hybrid Multi-Alkali) image intensifier tubes (bandwidth of 350-1100 nm, from near UV to IR)
- Safran Optics 1's AN/PAS-34 E-COSI (Enhanced Clip-On SWIR Imager) provides an overlay (in the 900-1700 nm range).

Ground personnel, weapon-mounted lasers:

- B.E. Meyers & Co. MAWL-CLAD (Modular Aiming Weapon Laser--Covert Laser Aiming Device) (1064 nm laser)
- LA-17/PEQ D-PILS (Dual-band Pointer and Illuminator Laser System) (1400-1600 nm)
- Rheinmetall LM-VAMPIR (Laser Module--VAriable Multi Purpose InfraRed)
- AN/PSQ-23 STORM, STORM-PI, STORM-SLX, STORM II; and L3Harris SPEAR (1570 nm)
- Optics 1 ICUGR (Integrated Compact Ultralight Gun-mounted Rangefinder) (1550 nm)
- Rheinmetall FCS-RPAL (Fire Control System--Rheinmetall Precision Aiming Laser) (1550 nm)
- Rheinmetall FCS-TRB (Fire Control System--TacRay Ballistic) (1550 nm)
- Wilcox RAPTAR S (Rapid Targeting and Ranging Module) (1550 nm)
- Wilcox MRF Xe (Micro Range Finder--Enhanced) (1550 nm)
- B.E. Meyers & Co. IZLID Ultra 1064 and 1550 (Infrared Zoom Laser Illuminator Designator) (1064 nm, 1550 nm)
- Optics 1 CTAM (Coded Target Acquisition Marker) (1064 nm)

== Wide field of view ==
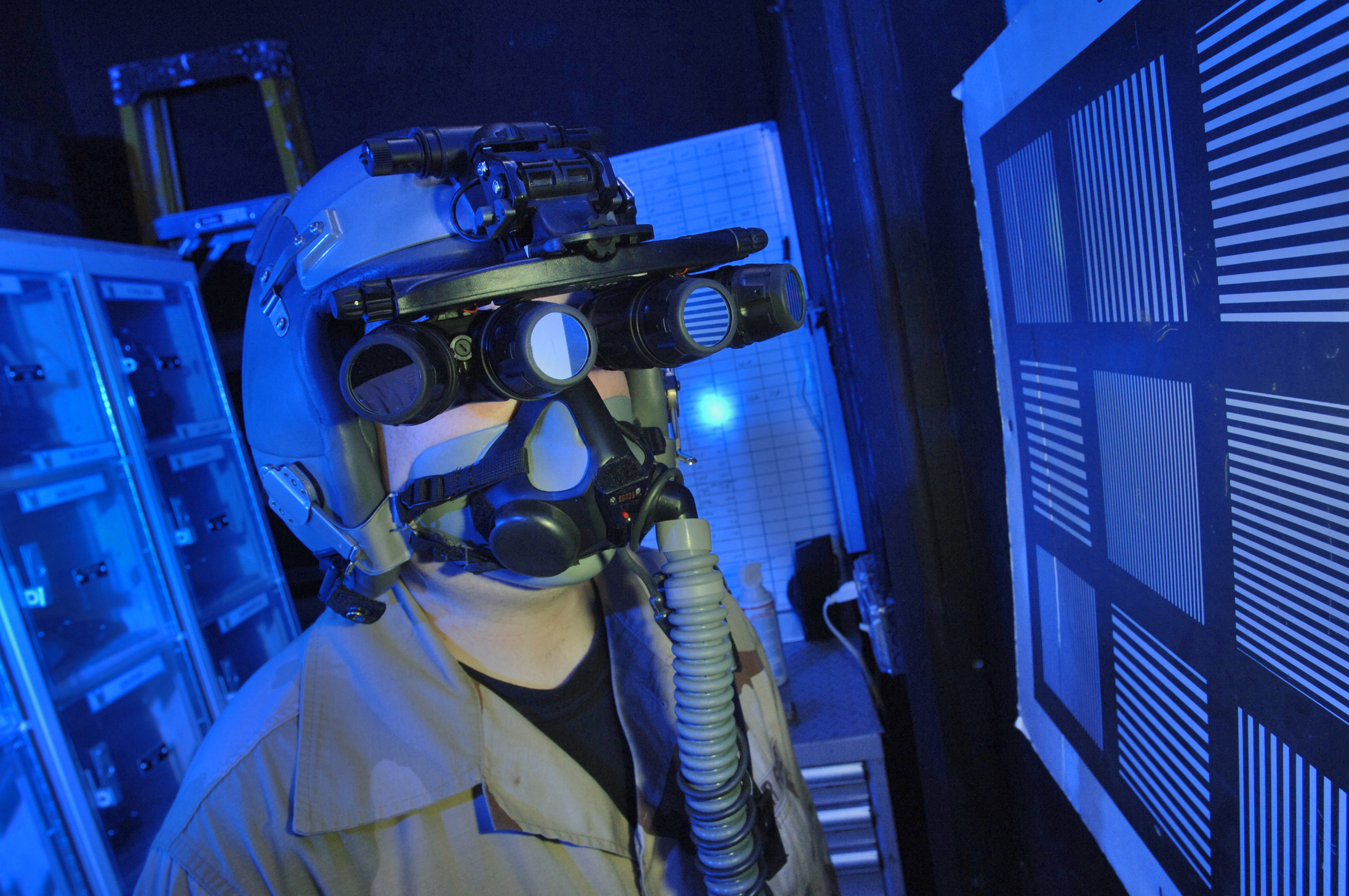
A US airman tests AN/AVS-10 panoramic night-vision goggles in March 2006.

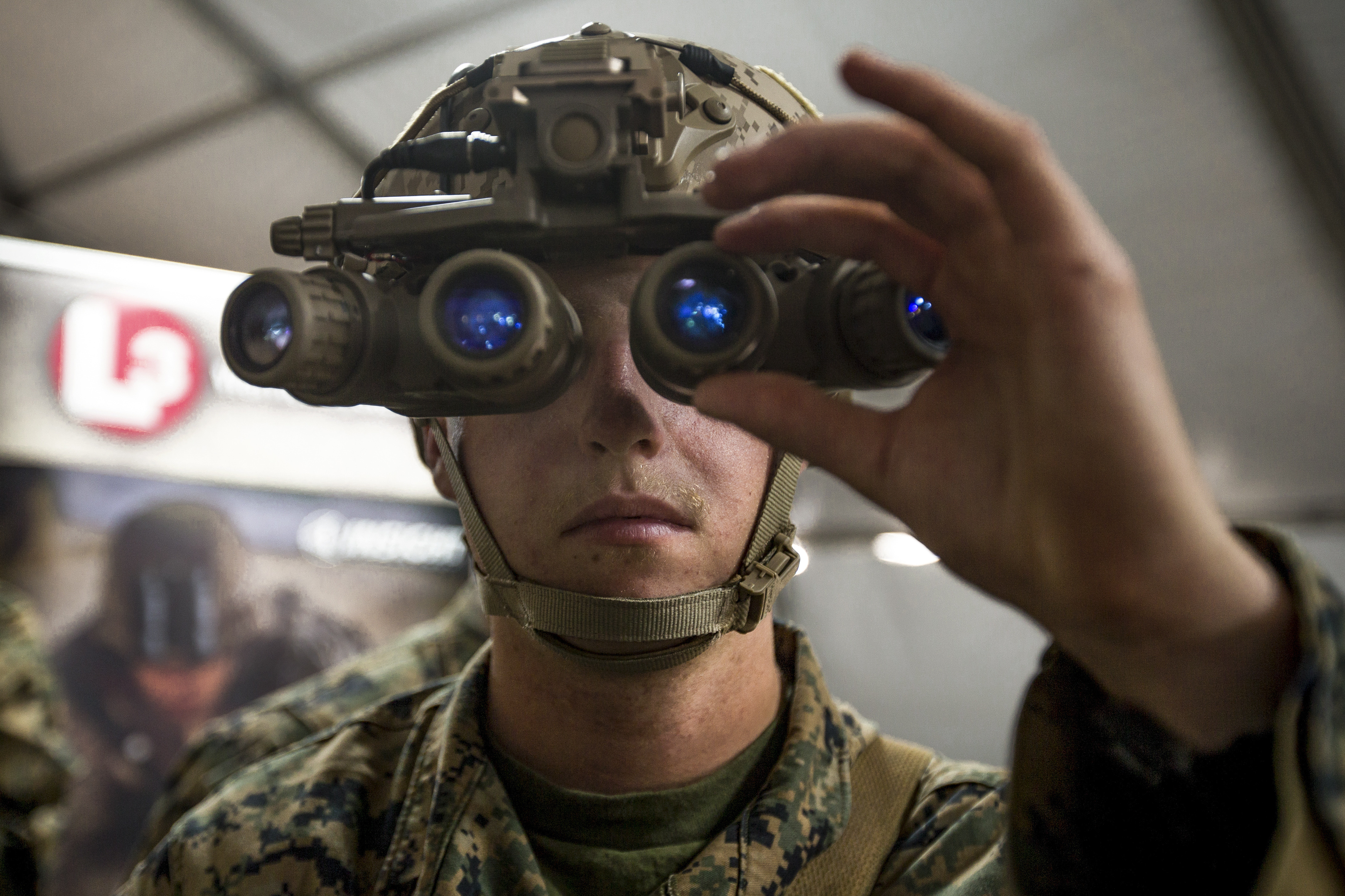
Member of the U.S. Marine Corps testing out the GPNVG-18.

Night vision devices typically have a limited field of view (FoV); the commonly used AN/PVS-14 has a FoV of 40, less than the 95° monocular horizontal FoV and humans' 190° binocular horizontal FoV. This forces users to turn their heads to compensate. This is particularly evident when flying, driving, or CQB, which involves split second decisions. These limitations led many SF/SOF operators to prefer white light rather than night vision when conducting CQB. As a result, much time and effort has gone into research to develop a wider FoV solution.

=== Panoramic night vision goggles ===
Panoramic night vision goggles (PNVG) increase FoV by increasing the number of sensor tubes. This solution adds size, weight, power requirements, and complexity. An example is GPNVG-18 (Ground Panoramic Night Vision Goggle). These goggles, and the aviation AN/AVS-10 PNVG from which they were derived, offer a 97° field of view.

Examples:

- GPNVG-18
- AN/AVS-10
- F-PANOS (Fused Panoramic Night Vision Goggle)

=== Foveated night vision ===
Foveated night vision (F-NVG) uses specialized WFoV optics to increase the field of view through an intensifier tube. The fovea refers to the part of the retina which is responsible for central vision. These devices have users look "straight through" the tubes so light passing through the center of the tube falls on the foveal retina, as is the case with traditional binocular NVGs. The increased FoV comes at the price of image quality and edge distortions. Examples:

- WFoV F-NVG retrofit AN/PVS-15 goggles
- WFoV BNVD (combined F-NVG and DIT-NVG variant of AN/PVS-31A)

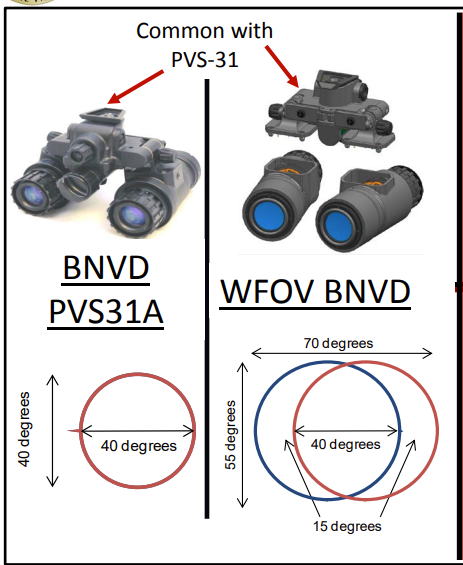
Diagram of the WFoV BNVD, based on AN/PVS-31A

=== Diverging image tube ===
Diverging image tube (DIT) night vision increases FoV by angle the tubes slightly outward. This increases peripheral FoV but causes distortion and reduced image quality. With DIT, users are no longer looking through the center of the tubes (which provides the clearest images) and light passing through the center of the tubes no longer falls on the fovea.

Examples:

- AN/PVS-25 (2000s).
- WFoV BNVD: variant of the AN/PVS-31A which incorporates both F-NVG and DIT-NVG. The foveal WFoV optics increase the FoV of each tube from 40° to 55°, while the angulation of the tubes positions them so there is a 40° overlap of binocular vision in the center and a total 70 °FoV. It offers a FoM of 2706, better than the FoM in either the GPNVG-18 and the standard AN/PVS-31A.
- Noise Fighters Panobridge: binocular bridge mount which combines two AN/PVS-14 monoculars and allows them to be angled. outward or positioned parallel

== Digital ==
Some night vision devices, including several of the ENVG (AN/PSQ-20) models, have digital thermal overlays. Introduced in the late 2000s, these allow transmission of the image, at the cost of increased size, weight, power usage.

High-sensitivity digital camera technology enables NVGs that combine a camera and a display instead of an image intensifier. These devices can offer Gen-1-equivalent quality at a lower cost. At the higher end, SiOnyx has produced digital color NVGs. The "Opsin" of 2022 has a form factor and helmet weight similar to an AN/PVS-14, but requires a separate battery pack. It offers a shorter battery life and lower sensitivity. It can however tolerate bright light and process a wider range of wavelengths.

== Other technologies ==
Ceramic Optical Ruggedized Engine (CORE) produces higher-performance Gen 1 tubes by replacing the glass plate with a ceramic plate. This plate is produced from specially formulated ceramic and metal alloys. Edge distortion is improved, photo sensitivity is increased, and the resolution can be as high as 60 lp/mm. CORE is still designated Gen 1 as it does not use a microchannel plate.

A night-vision contact lens prototype places a thin strip of graphene between layers of glass that reacts to photons to brighten dark images. Prototypes absorb only 2.3% of light, which is considered not yet enough for practical use by its developers.

The Sensor and Electron Devices Directorate (SEDD) of the US Army Research Laboratory developed quantum-well infrared detector (QWID). This technology's epitaxial layers use a gallium arsenide (GaAs) or aluminum gallium arsenide system (AlGaAs) which are particularly sensitive to mid-length infrared waves. The Corrugated QWID (CQWID) broadens detection capacity by using a resonance superstructure to orient more of the electric field parallel so that it can be absorbed, although cryogenic cooling between 77 K and 85 K is required. QWID technology may be appropriate for continuous surveillance viewing due to its claimed low cost and uniformity in materials but it has yet to enter commercial production.

Materials from the II–VI compounds, such as HgCdTe, are used for high-performance infrared light-sensing cameras. An alternative within the III–V family of compounds is InAsSb, which is common in opto-electronics such as DVDs and mobile phones. A graded layer with increased atomic spacing and an intermediate layer of GaAs substrate can trap any potential defects.

Metasurface-based upconversion technology provides a night-vision film that weighs less than a gram and can be placed across ordinary glasses. Photons pass through a resonant non-local lithium niobate metasurface with a pump beam. The metasurface boosts the photons' energy, pushing them into the visible spectrum without converting them to electrons. Cooling is not required and visible and infrared light appear in a single image. Its frequency range is 1550-nm infrared to visible 550-nm light. Because, traditionally, night-vision systems capture side-by-side views from each spectrum, they can't produce identical images unlike films applied to ordinary glasses.

In 2025, researchers at the NYU Tandon School of Engineering reported heavy-metal-free silver selenide (Ag_{2}Se) colloidal quantum-dot inks for near- to short-wave infrared detection, offering a scalable, solution-processed alternative to detectors that rely on mercury or lead compounds.

== Soviet Union/Russia ==
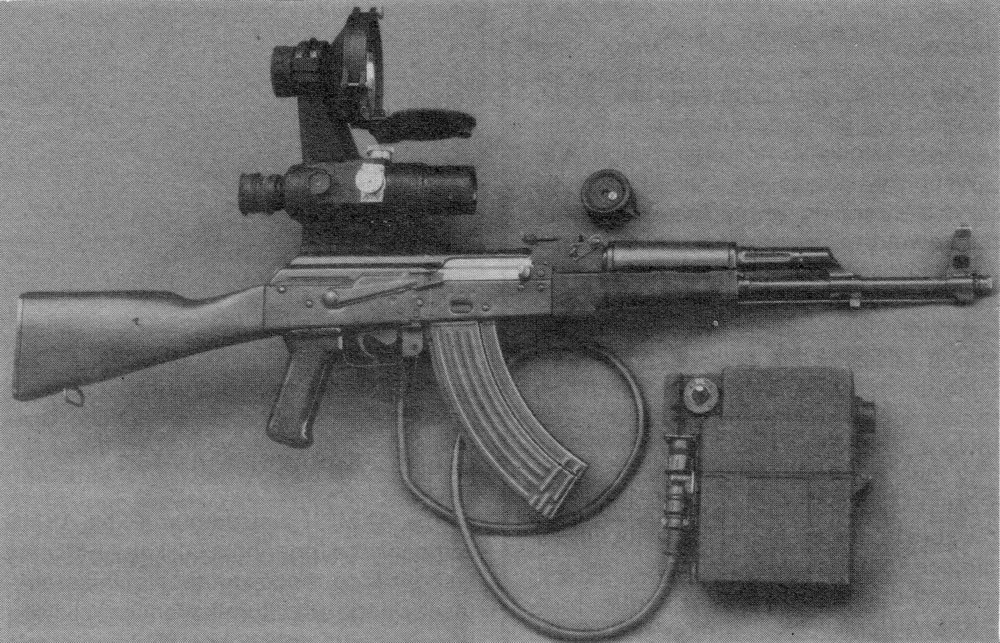
Active night-vision scope NSP-2 mounted on an AKML

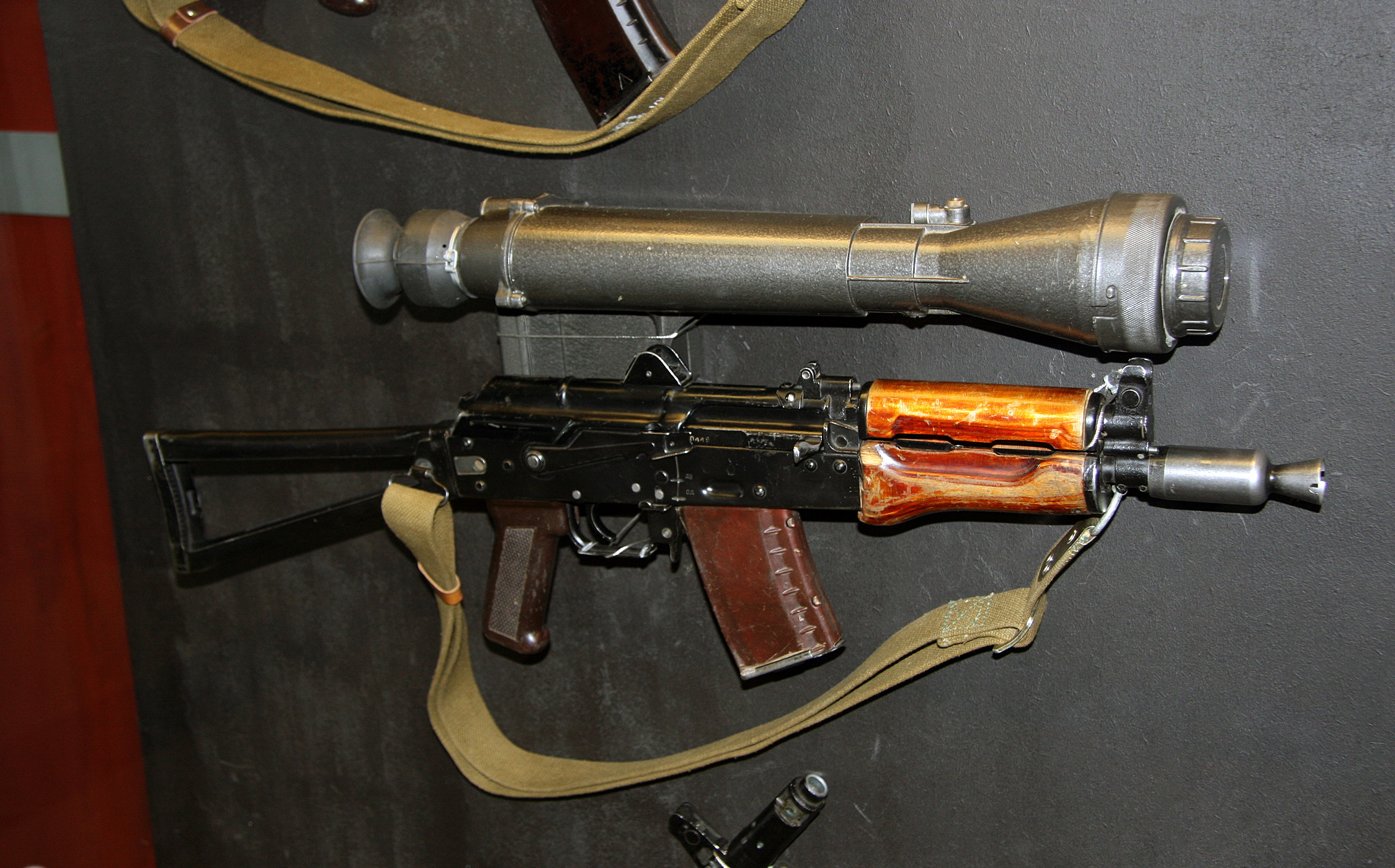
NSPU (1PN34) 3.5× night-vision scope mounted on an AKS-74U

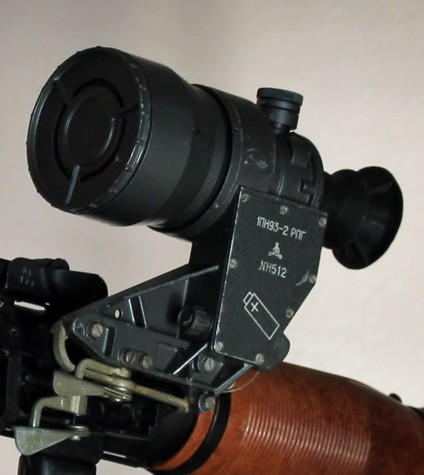
1PN93-2 night-vision scope mounted on a RPG-7D3

The Soviet Union, and after 1991 the Russian Federation, have developed their own night-vision devices. Models used after 1960 by the Russian/Soviet Army are designated 1PNxx (Russian: 1ПНxx), where 1PN is the GRAU index of night-vision devices. The PN stands for pritsel nochnoy (Russian: прицел ночной), meaning "night sight", and the xx is the model number. Different models introduced around the same time use the same type of batteries and mounting mechanism. Multi-weapon models have replaceable elevation scales, with one scale for the ballistic arc of each. Supported weapons include the AK family, sniper rifles, light machine guns and hand-held grenade launchers.

- 1PN34 refractor-based night sight for a range of small arms and grenade launchers (photo)
- 1PN50 refractor-based night observation binoculars.
- 1PN51 reflector-based night sight for a range of small arms and grenade launchers.
- 1PN51-2 reflector-based night sight for the RPG-29.
- 1PN58 refractor-based night sight for a range of small arms and grenade launchers.
- 1PN93-2 reflector-based night sight for the RPG-7D3, see photo.
- 1PN110, a more recent (~Gen 3) night sight for the RPG-29.
- 1PN113, a night sight similar to the 1PN110, for the SV-98 sniper rifle.

The Russian army fielded a series of so-called counter-sniper night sights (Russian: Антиснайпер, romanized: Antisnayper). The counter-sniper night sight is an active system that uses laser pulses from a laser diode to detect reflections from the focal elements of enemy optical systems and estimate their distance:

- 1PN106 counter-sniper night sight for the SVD sniper rifle and its SVDS variant.
- 1PN119 counter-sniper night sight for the PKMN and Pecheneg light machine guns.
- 1PN120 counter-sniper night sight for the SVDK sniper rifle.
- 1PN121 counter-sniper night sight for the ASVK large caliber sniper rifle.
- 1PN123 counter-sniper night sight for the SV-98 sniper rifle.

== Legal restrictions ==
- Belgium: firearms legislation forbids night-vision devices that can be mounted on a firearm.
- Czech Republic: not regulated. Previously only available for hunting.
- Germany: law forbids such devices if their purpose is to be mounted on firearms except for hunting wild boars.
- Iceland: night-vision devices for hunting is prohibited, although owning the devices is permitted.
- India: civilian possession and trading of night-vision scopes is prohibited without permission from Union home ministry.
- Netherlands: possession is not regulated, but night-vision devices mounted on firearms require a permit. Using mounted night-vision equipment for hunting requires a permit in the Veluwe for hunting wild boar.
- New Zealand: rescue helicopter services use US-made Gen3 goggles for use only according to US export regulations. Use of NVD for shooting non-indigenous game animals, such as rabbits, hares, deer, pigs, tahr, chamois, goats, wallabies, is permitted.
- United States: a 2010–2011 summary of state hunting regulations for the use of night-vision equipment in hunting listed 13 states in which the equipment is prohibited, 17 states with various restrictions (e.g. only for certain non-game species, and/or in a certain date range), and 20 states without restrictions. It did not summarize the regulations for thermal-imaging equipment.
  - California: possessing a device "designed for or adaptable to use on a firearm which, through the use of a projected infrared light source and electronic telescope, enables the operator thereof to visually determine and locate the presence of objects during the night-time" is a misdemeanor. This essentially covers scopes using Gen0 technology, but not subsequent generations.
  - Minnesota, as of 2014, "A person may not possess night vision or thermal imaging equipment while taking wild animals or while having in possession [an uncased and loaded weapon] that could be used to take wild animals." Law-enforcement and military use is exempt.

== See also ==
- Daly detector – Type of gas-phase ion detector
- Image intensifier – Vacuum tube device for increasing the intensity of available light
- Infrared photography – Near-infrared imaging
- Joint Electronics Type Designation System – Unclassified designation system for United States military electronic equipment
- List of military electronics of the United States
- Low light level television – Electronic light sensing device sensitive to wavelengths into the near infrared
- Photomultiplier
- Thermal imaging camera – Thermal imaging camera in firefighting
- Laser sight (firearms) – Laser device used to assist the aiming of a firearm
- Javelin man portable missile thermal sight
