= 1PN58 =

Soviet small arms night scope

1PN58/NSPU-1
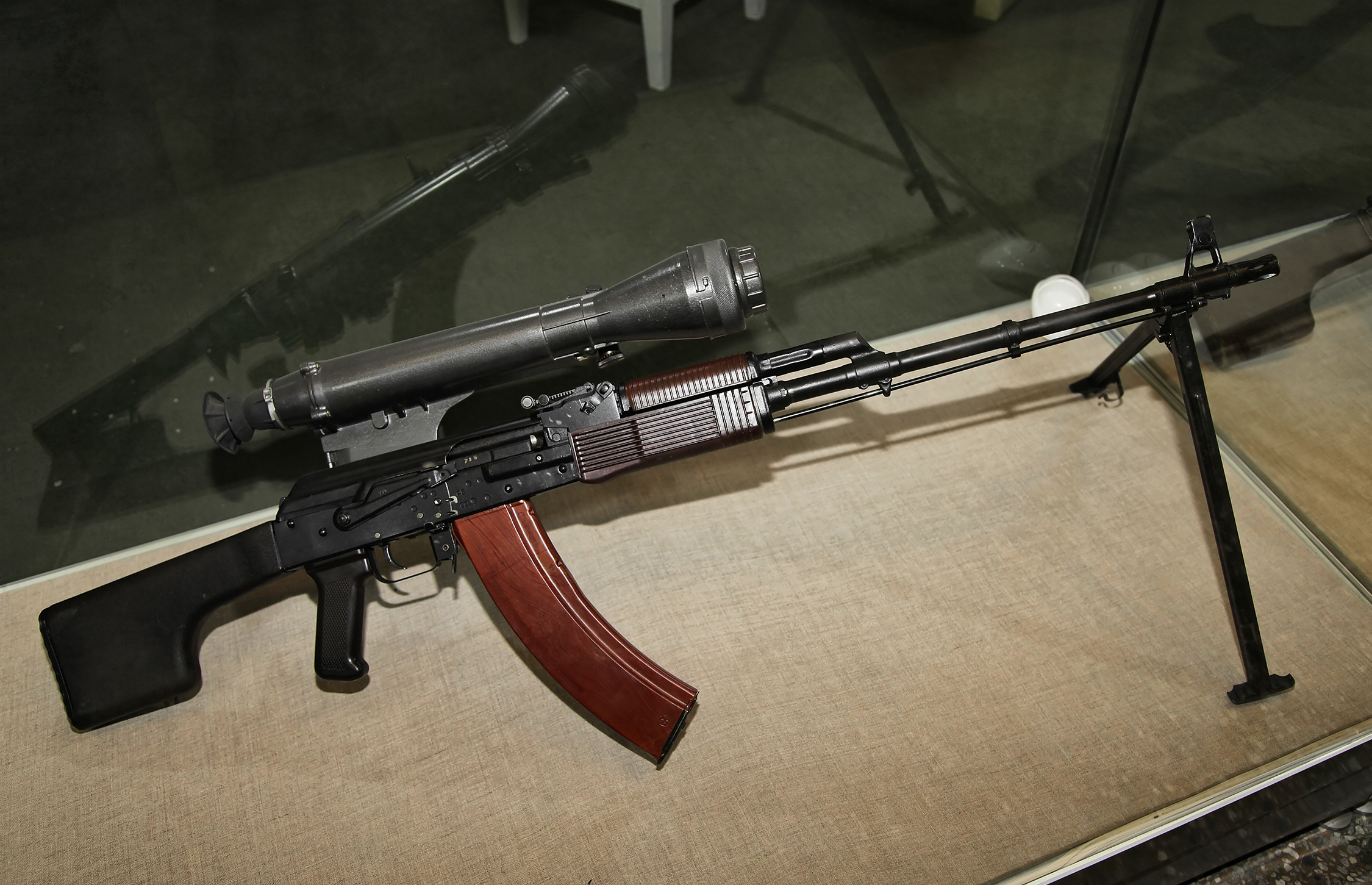
- RPK-74N2 with night scope 1PN58
- Type: Passive
- Place of origin: Soviet Union
- Category: Weapon Sight

Service history
- In service: 1970s–present
- Used by: Soviet Union; Russia; Ukraine; Numerous others (see users)
- Wars: Soviet-Afghan War; Chechen-Russian conflict; South Ossetia War; Russo-Ukrainian War; War in Donbass; Syrian Civil War; Iraq War; Numerous others

Production history
- Designed: 1970s
- Produced: 1970s-1991

Specifications
- Weight: 2kg (4.4 pounds)
- Dimensions (L×H×W): 458 mm × 186 mm × 99 mm
- Mode of Operation: Passive
- Field of vision (°): 14.5 degrees
- Range of detection: 970m (Starlight)
- Range of recognition: 400m (Starlight)
- System zoom: 3.5x

1PN58 (Russian: 1ПН58) is the GRAU index for a Soviet designed passive night scope for a range of Soviet designed small arms and grenade launchers. 1PN is the GRAU index of night vision devices, where PN stands for Nochnoy Pritsel (Russian: Ночной прицел) meaning night sight. It is also called NSPUM (Russian: НСПУМ). or NSPU-1. The 1PN58 was introduced into Soviet service in the early 1970s and is still used by many of the Soviet Union's successor states, and has been used in numerous conflicts around the world.

== Details ==
The 1PN58 gathers light into a refractor which can be protected with an aperture cover. The center of the cover has a circular aperture with dark glass allowing the scope to be used in light conditions that would otherwise saturate the light intensifier. For zeroing the sight the left side of the scope has two perpendicular knobs, of which the elevation knob has a detachable scale. The scope comes with seven different, detachable elevation scales, one for each of the supported weapons. The scope has a magnification of 3.5x.

On the left below the aperture the device has a brightness knob. Apart from powering on and off the device, this knob controls the brightness of the reticle allowing for the reticle to be visible without outshining the target.

The reticle has markings that match targets of various heights from 0.3 m to 2.7 m at distances ranging from 100 m to 970 m. This is similar to the reticle of the 1PN51.

The light intensifier is powered by a pack of 5 D-0,55S (Russian: Д-0,55С) rechargeable cells, providing up to 7 V. The scope requires 6.25 V. The current drawn is 7 mA.

The D-0,55S battery pack is used by a range of devices including 1PN51 and 1PN51-2 and has a separate charging device. The charging device has a switch to select one of 12 V or 27 V input and two red control lamps, one to indicate that power is available and one to indicate that charging is complete.

The 1PN58 is attached to weapons via a side-mounted dovetail mount. This type of mount was identical to the type used on the SVD Dragunov but was only fitted to specialized versions of most weapons, such as the AK-74N and AKMN. This mount is fitted to all new AK-74M rifles used by the Russian Army. Weapons fitted with this mount can also utilize other Soviet optics, such as the PSO-1 and PGO-7 scope for the RPG-7.

The 1PN58 comes in a metal container with room for extra batteries, battery charger and the other accessories, weighing 7.3 kg in total. They were widely utilized by the Soviet Army, several being issued to every motor-rifle platoon.

== Supported weapons ==
The 1PN58 can be used with the following weapons. This list is incomplete, as any weapon fitted with the Soviet-style dovetail mount can technically use this optic.

- SVDN2, and all Dragunov Rifle variants
- AK-74N2, AKS-74N2, and AK-74M
- PKMN2, PKMSN2
- RPG-7N2, RPG-7DN2
- AKMN2, AKMSN2
- RPK-74N2, RPKS-74N2, and RPK-74M
- RPKN2 (RPKSN2)
- AK-100 Series
- VSS Vintorez
- AS Val
- PSL (rifle)
- Zastava M76
- SVDK

== Users ==
- Azerbaijan
- Belarus
- Iraq
- India
- Kazakhstan
- Moldova
- Russia
- Soviet Union
- Syria
- Tajikistan
- Turkmenistan
- Ukraine
- Uzbekistan

== Image gallery ==
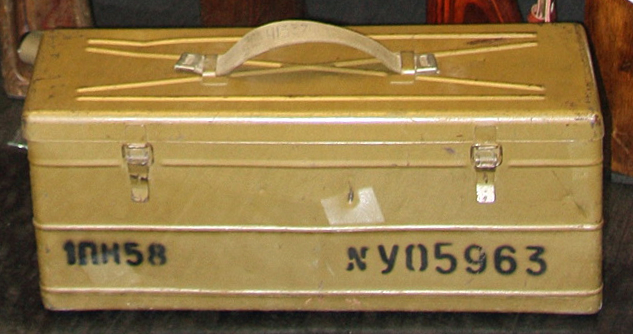
1PN58 metal container with serial number

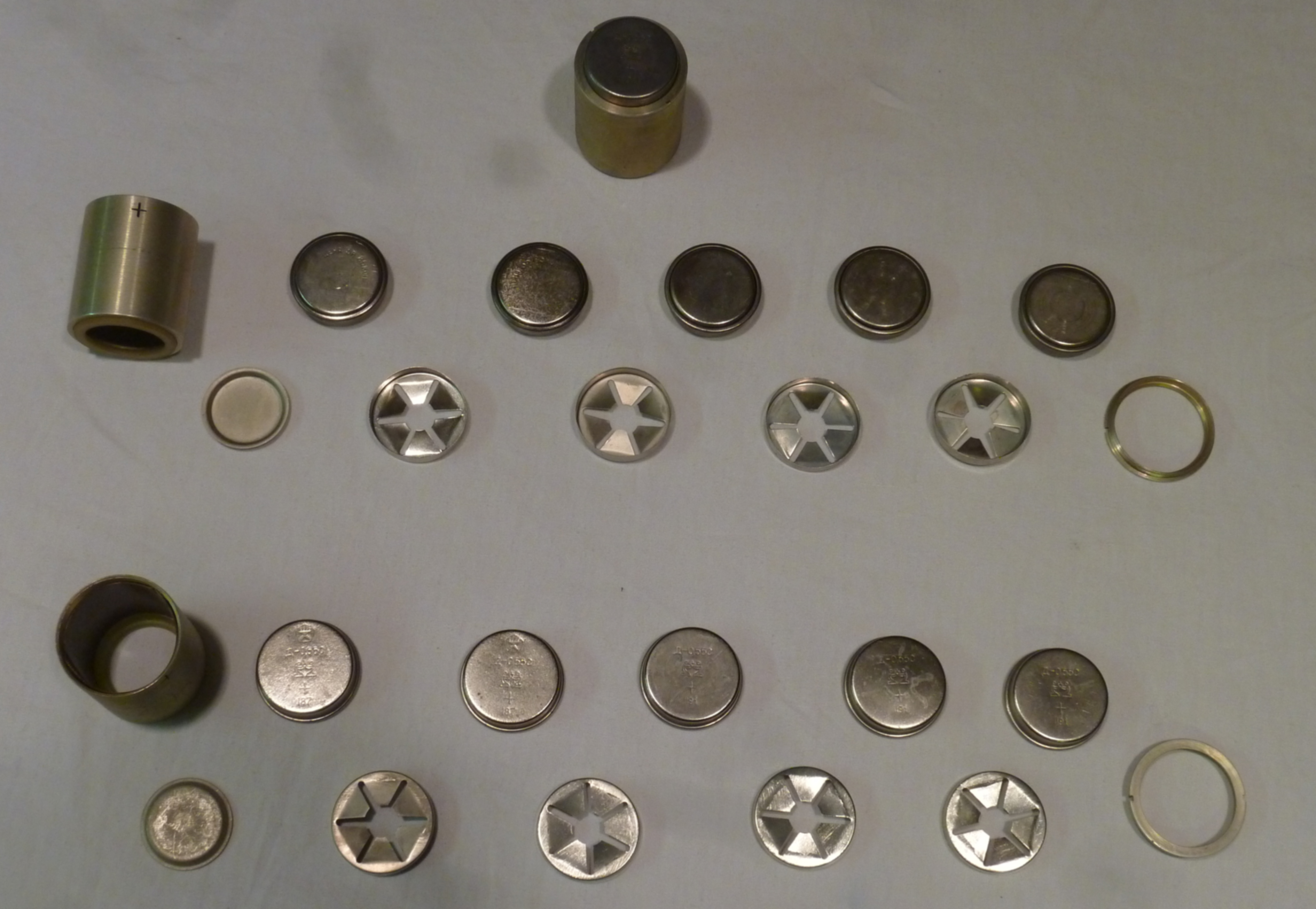
Three battery packs for the 1PN58, two of which are disassembled

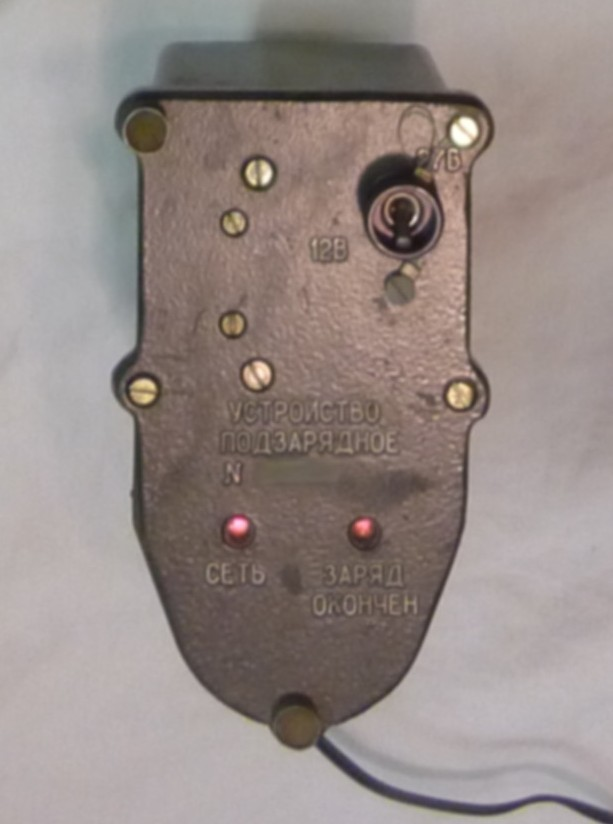
Battery charger for the 1PN58
