= AN/PVS-7 =

Biocular night vision device

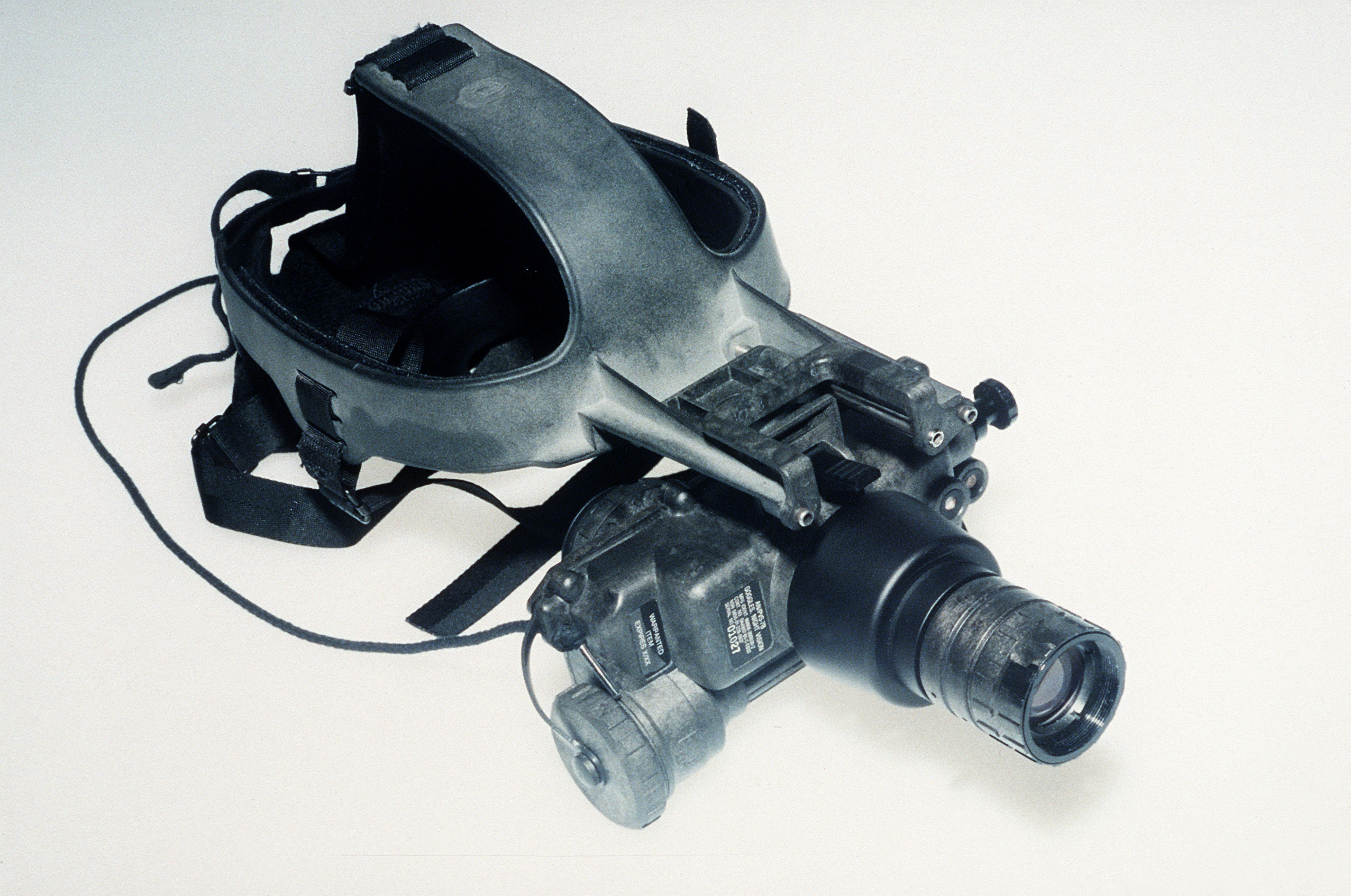
- An early version of the AN/PVS-7B goggle
- Type: Passive/Active
- Place of origin: United States
- Category: Head-mountable

Service history
- In service: 1988–present
- Used by: United States Armed Forces; Philippine Army; Argentine Army; Canadian Forces; Australian Army; Danish Home Guard
- Wars: United States invasion of Panama; Persian Gulf War; War in Afghanistan; Iraq War

Production history
- Designer: ITT Industries; Litton Industries
- Designed: 1982
- Manufacturer: ITT Industries; Litton Industries; Northrop Grumman; L3 Communications Armasight, Inc
- Variants: AN/PVS-7A; AN/PVS-7B; AN/PVS-7C; AN/PVS-7D

Specifications
- Weight: 520 grams (680 grams including head mount)
- Dimensions (L×H×W): 5.8" x 3.1" x 6.1"
- Resolution (lp/mm): >64 lp/mm
- Tube form factor: 18mm
- Field of vision (°): 40 degrees
- Range of detection: 325m (Starlight)
- Range of recognition: 225m (Starlight)
- System zoom: 1×
- Generation: 2 or 3

The AN/PVS-7 is a single tube biocular night vision device. Third-generation image intensifiers are able to be installed and are standard for military night vision. Most newer PVS-7 intensifier tubes are auto-gated to prevent image intensifier damage if exposed to intense light. The goggles have a built-in infrared Illuminator for low-light situations. They are waterproof and charged with nitrogen to prevent internal condensation while moving between extreme temperatures.

They were designed to replace the older AN/PVS-5 from the Vietnam War. Though slowly being phased out by the AN/PVS-14, the AN/PVS-7 is still being used by the United States Armed Forces with hundreds of thousands in service.

In accordance with the Joint Electronics Type Designation System (JETDS), the "AN/PVS-7" designation represents the 7th design of an Army-Navy electronic device for portable visual detection equipment. The JETDS system also now is used to name all Department of Defense electronic systems.

== Users ==
- Argentina: Used by Argentine Army.
- Australia
- Canada
- Croatia: Seen in several recent exhibitions.
- Denmark: Used by Danish Home Guard
- Philippines
- Ukraine
- United States

== See also ==
- List of military electronics of the United States
