= 1PN51 =

Soviet small arms night scope

1PN51 (Russian: 1ПН51) is the GRAU index for a Soviet designed passive night scope for a range of Soviet designed small arms and grenade launchers. 1PN is the GRAU index of night vision devices, where PN stands for Nochnoy Pritsel (Russian: Ночной прицел) meaning night sight.

The scope weighs 2.1 kg and measures 276 mm × 210 mm × 140 mm (length × height × width).

It is attached onto a matching side rail on the weapon after which a lever on the scope is pressed to hold it in place.

The 1PN51 comes in a metal container with room for extra batteries, battery charger and the other accessories, weighing 6.45 kg in total.

== Optics ==
The scope gathers light via an 80 mm aperture into a reflector with the secondary mirror obscuring the central 42 mm of the aperture.

For zeroing the sight the top of the scope has two perpendicular knobs, of which the elevation knob has a detachable scale. The scope comes with eight different, detachable elevation scales for the supported weapons.

The aperture cover itself has two 12 mm apertures that can be opened partially allowing the scope to be used in light conditions that would otherwise saturate the light intensifier.

The rear end of the scope is a focus dial.

The eyepiece has a detachable soft rubber eyecup.

The scope has a magnification of 3.46.

== Light intensifier and reticle ==
On the left below the aperture the device has a brightness knob. Apart from powering on and off the device, this knob controls the brightness of the reticle allowing for the reticle to be visible without outshining the target.

The reticle has markings that match targets of various heights from 0.3 m to 2.7 m at distances ranging from 100 m to 970 m. This is similar to the reticle of the 1PN58.

== Power ==
The light intensifier is powered by a pack of 5 D-0,55S (Russian: Д-0,55С) rechargeable cells, providing up to 7 V. The scope requires 6.25 V. The maximum current drawn is 40 mA.

The D-0,55S battery pack is used by a range of devices including 1PN51-2 and 1PN58 and has a separate charging device. The charging device has a switch to select one of 12 V or 27 V input and two red control lamps, one to indicate that power is available and one to indicate that charging is complete.

== Supported weapons ==
As of 1993 the 1PN51 can be used with the following weapons (weapons on the same line share the elevation scale):

- SVDN-1,
- AK-74N (AKS-74N),
- PKMN-1 (PKMSN-1),
- RPG-7N1 (RPG-7DN1),
- AKMN-1 (AKMSN-1),
- RPK-74N (RPKS-74N),
- AKS-74UN (no elevation scale),
- RPKN-1 (RPKSN-1),
- VSS Vintorez, AS Val,
- AK-103N2 (AK-103N2).

== Image gallery ==
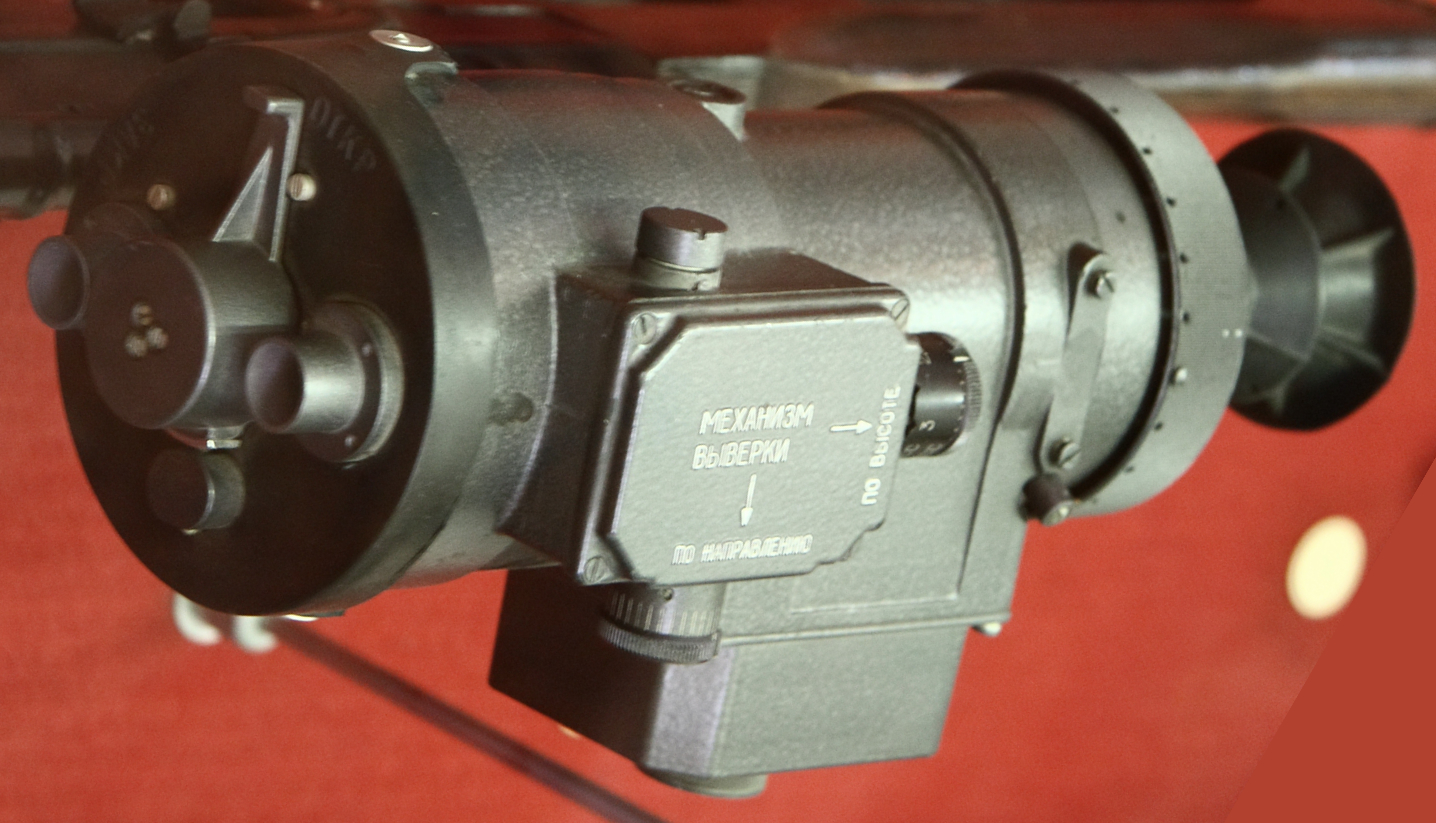
A 1PN51 with its aperture cover set to open mounted on a weapon

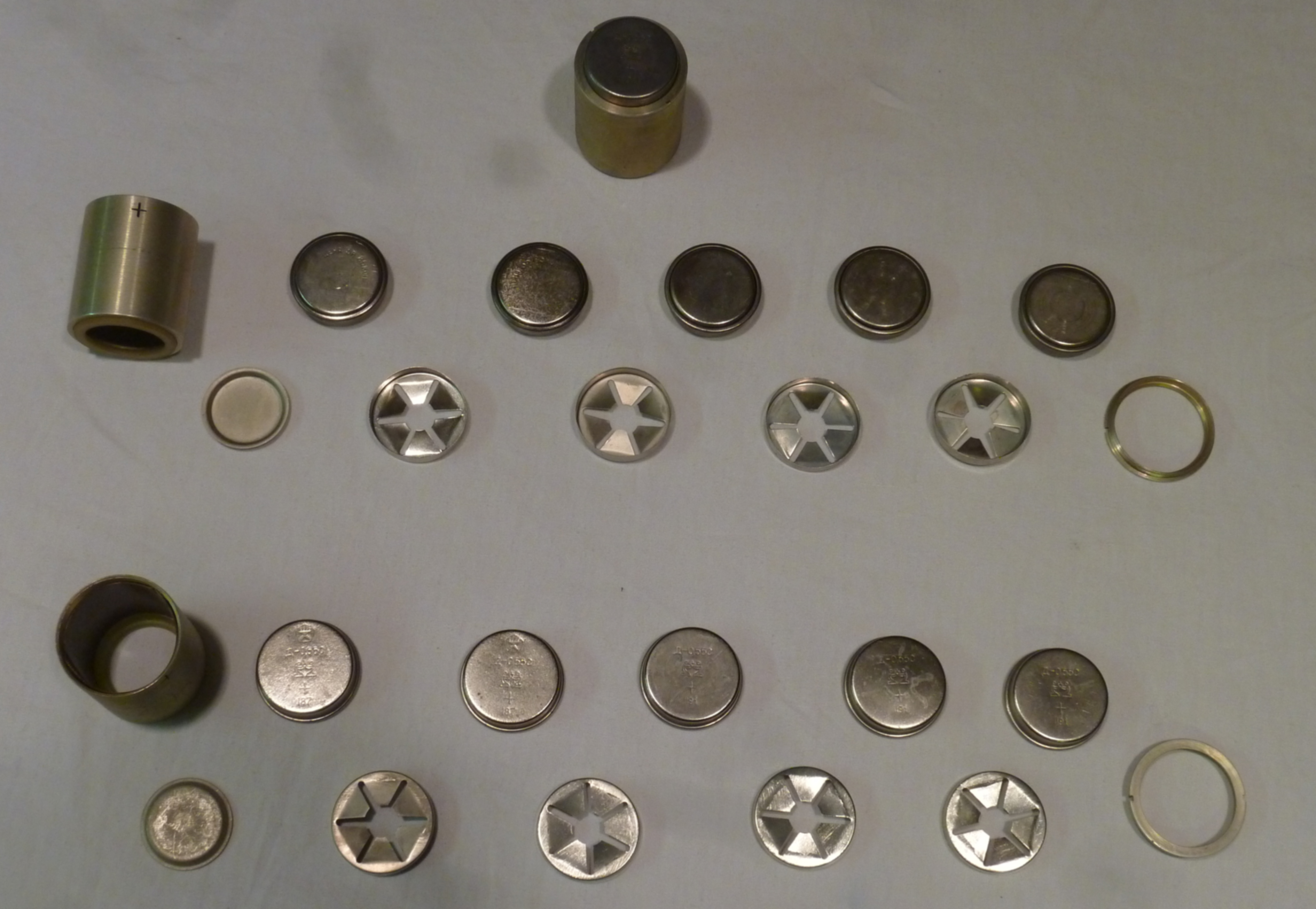
Three battery packs for the 1PN51, two of which are disassembled

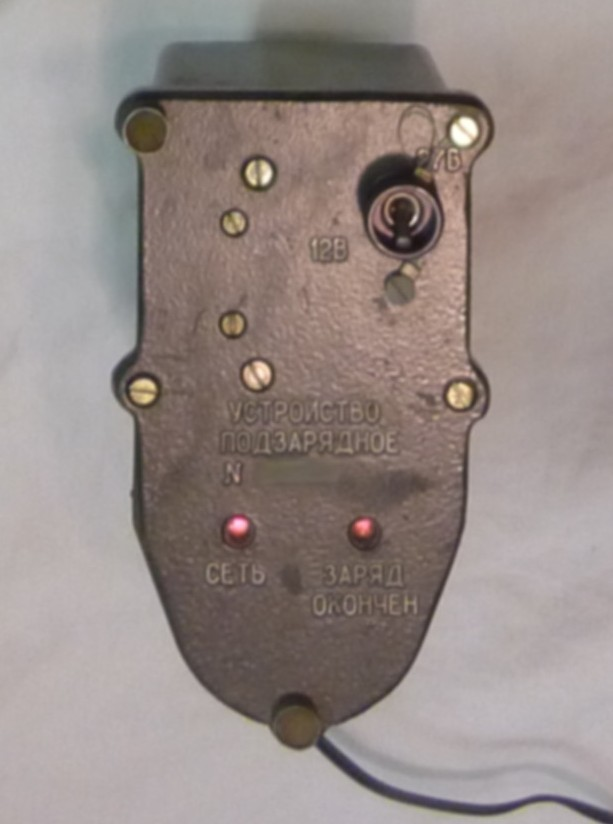
Battery charger for the 1PN51
