= Kalashnikov Concern AMB-17 =

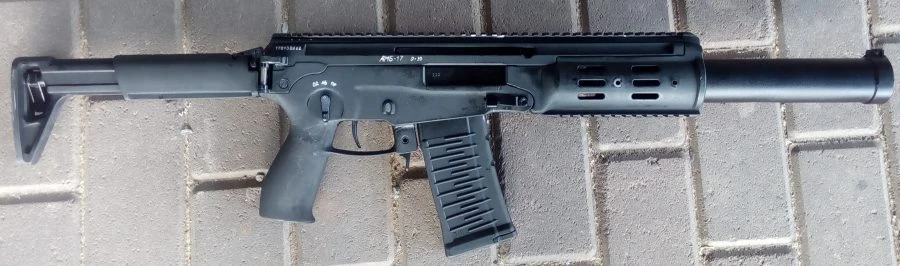
- Kalashnikov Concern AMB-17 with its stock extended
- Type: Assault rifle Carbine
- Place of origin: Russian Federation

Service history
- In service: 2018–present
- Used by: See Users

Production history
- Designed: 2015
- Manufacturer: Kalashnikov Concern

Specifications
- Mass: 2.9 kg (6.39 lb)
- Length: 850 mm (33 in) (stock extended); 600 mm (23.6 in) (stock folded)
- Barrel length: 200 mm (7.9 in)
- Cartridge: 9×39mm
- Action: Gas-operated, rotating bolt
- Rate of fire: 700 rounds/min
- Muzzle velocity: 290–305 m/s
- Feed system: 10-, 20-, 30-round VSS Vintorez-pattern detachable magazines
- Sights: Adjustable iron sights and various optical sights by the use of Picatinny rail

The Kalashnikov Concern AMB-17 (Russian: Aвтомат Малогабаритный Бесшумный, romanized: Avtomat Malogabaritnyj Besshumnyj, lit. 'Suppressed Small-sized Automatic Rifle') is an integrally suppressed compact assault rifle chambered in 9×39mm subsonic cartridge, developed and manufactured alongside the Kalashnikov Concern AM-17 that was based on the Yevgeny Dragunov MA prototype. Both the AM-17 and AMB-17 were unveiled by Kalashnikov Concern at the Russian Army Expo 2017.

The AMB-17 is designed for covert close quarters operations, primarily for special units of the Russian Interior Ministry and the Russian Army intended as a potential replacement for the AS Val and VSS Vintorez.

== Design details ==
The AMB-17 features an integral suppressor mounted on the front of the upper receiver which wraps around the barrel. In order for the suppressor to be integrated, the AMB-17 employs a wider opening within its handguard as compared to the AM-17, along with the front of the upper receiver which also allows for an integrated handguard half-length MIL-STD/1913 Picatinny rail. The integrated upper also includes a full-length MIL-STD/1913 Picatinny railing, polymer side-folding and adjustable (telescoping) shoulder stock, and longitudinal slots in the walls of the upper receiver allowing for ambidextrous controls in both the fire selector and charging handle.

The AMB-17 is chambered for the 9×39mm subsonic cartridge (SP5 FMJ and SP6 armour-piercing), and uses the VSS Vintorez-pattern detachable box magazines.

=== Operating mechanism ===
The AMB-17, unlike previous firearms in current use with the Russian military, differentiates itself by employing two receivers that connect on a hinge instead of a single stamped receiver with a lid. To do this, the upper receiver itself is made from polymer and steel reinforcements, while the lower receiver along with its magazine housing is made entirely from polymer, and connected to the upper receiver by two captive take down cross-pins, reducing the weight of the firearm significantly and allowing for easier access into the internal operation. The gas operated action uses a short stroke gas piston and rotary bolt which locks with three radial lugs on the bolt head, similar to previous 9×39mm compact assault rifles, such as the VSK-94. The bolt carrier within the upper receiver is almost streamline by design raising it towards the bolt group reducing both bolt friction and felt user recoil.

=== Ammunition ===
The 9×39mm cartridge is very effective at penetrating body armour. The SP-6 cartridge type features a hardened steel or tungsten tip and can penetrate a 6 mm (0.2 in) high-density steel plate at 100 m; a 2 mm (0.08 in) steel plate or a standard army helmet can be fully penetrated at 500 m; however, its effective range is under 400 m.

== Users ==
- Russia: The AMB-17 is in limited use with the Russian FSB and FSO specifically for firearms testing and has yet to complete acceptance trials.

== See also ==
- AK-9
- OTs-12 Tiss
- OTs-14 Groza
- SR-3 Vikhr
- List of Russian weaponry
- List of equipment of the Russian Ground Forces
