= Kalashnikov Concern AM-17 =

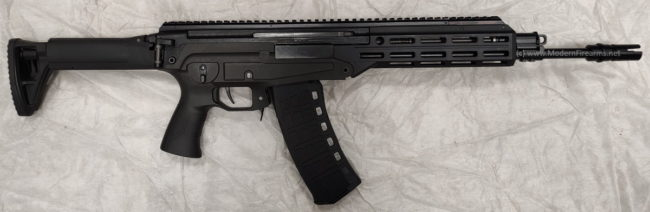
- A prototype of the Kalashnikov Concern AM-17M
- Type: Assault rifle Carbine
- Place of origin: Russian Federation

Service history
- In service: 2025–present
- Used by: See Users
- Wars: Russian invasion of Ukraine

Production history
- Designed: 2015
- Manufacturer: Kalashnikov Concern
- Produced: September 2025

Specifications
- Mass: 2.5 kg (5.51 lb)
- Length: 750 mm (30 in)(stock extended); 490 mm (19.3 in) (stock folded)
- Barrel length: 230 mm (9.1 in)
- Cartridge: 5.45×39mm
- Action: Gas-operated, rotating bolt
- Rate of fire: 850 (±50) rounds/min
- Feed system: 30-round detachable box magazine
- Sights: Adjustable iron sights and various optical sights by the use of Picatinny rail

The Kalashnikov Concern AM-17 (Russian: Aвтомат Малогабаритный, romanized: Avtomat Malogabaritnyj, lit. 'Small-sized Automatic Rifle', GRAU index: 6P74) is a compact assault rifle chambered in 5.45×39mm intermediate cartridge, developed and manufactured by Kalashnikov Concern as a replacement to the AKS-74U.

== History ==
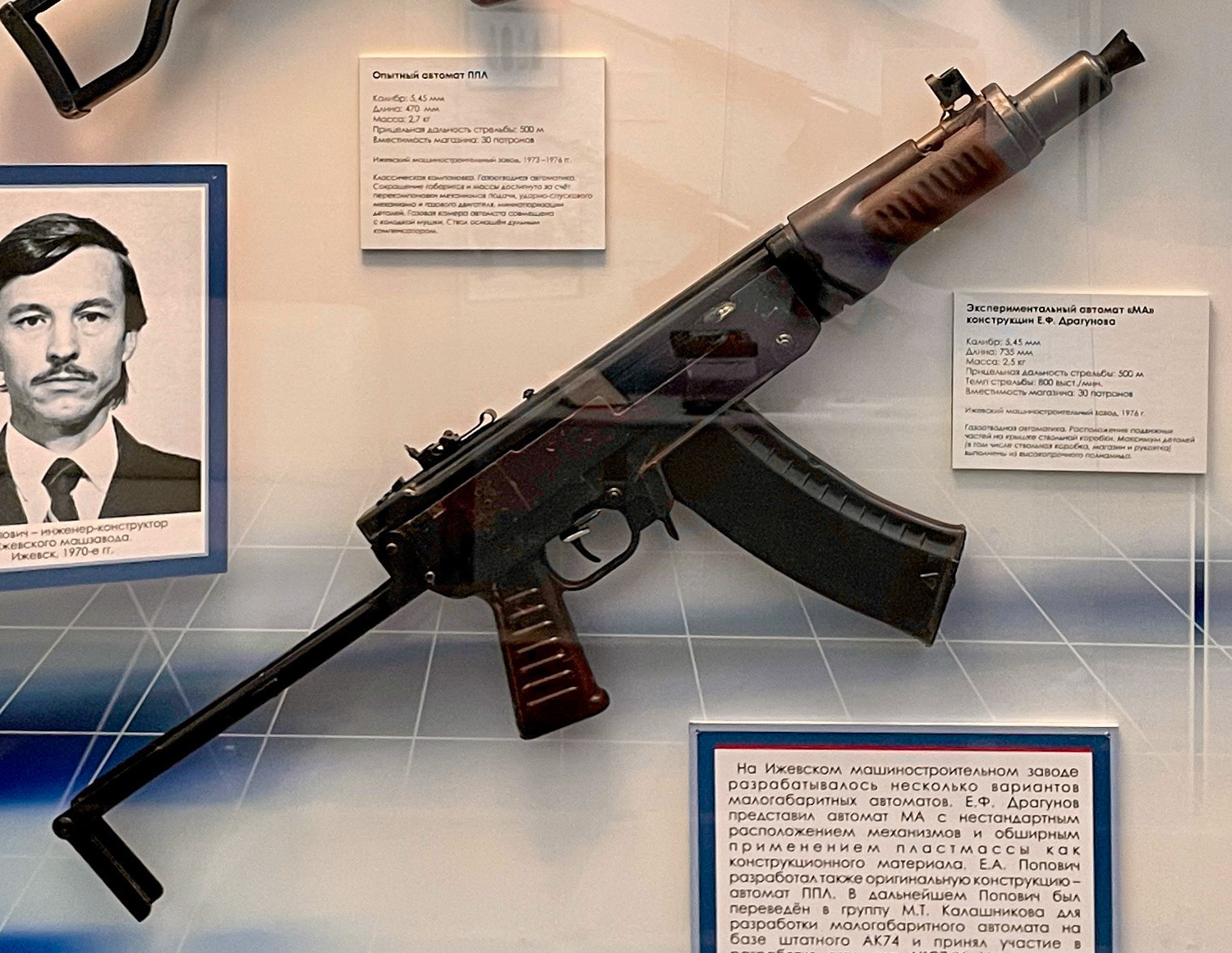
Late 1970s MA compact assault rifle prototype designed by Yevgeny Dragunov

The AM-17 was first unveiled in the Russian Army Expo 2017 alongside the integrally suppressed AMB-17. Its development began in the late 2010s, and was based on the Yevgeny Dragunov MA compact assault rifle.

In November 2024, the AM-17 has completed the acceptance trials. Serial production of the carbine is expected to begin in 2025. On September 1, 2025, Kalashnikov Concern reported that the first experimental batch of the AM-17 had been manufactured.

== Design details ==
The AM-17 is designed for close quarters operations, primarily for combat vehicle crews, special forces and law enforcement units of the Russian Interior Ministry, Russian National Guard, and Russian Army to replace the AKS-74U.

The AM-17 features an integrated upper full-length MIL-STD/1913 Picatinny rail system, a polymer side-folding and adjustable telescoping buttstock, and the upper receiver has elongated slots along its sides, providing ambidextrous controls for both the fire selector and the charging handle.

=== Operating mechanism ===
The AM-17, unlike previous firearms in current use by the Russian military, differentiates itself by employing two receivers that connect on a hinge instead of a single stamped receiver with a lid.

To do this the upper receiver itself is made from polymer and steel reinforcements, while the lower receiver along with its magazine housing is made entirely from polymer and connected to the upper receiver by two captive take down cross-pins reducing the weight of the firearm significantly and allowing for easier access into the internal operation.

The gas-operated action within is a short-stroke gas piston and rotary bolt which locks with three radial lugs on the bolt head similar to historic 9×39mm compact assault rifles, such as the VSK-94.

The bolt carrier within the upper receiver is almost streamline by design raising it towards the bolt group reducing both bolt friction and felt user recoil.

== Variants ==
=== AM-17M ===
The AM-17M is a full-length assault rifle variant in prototype development.

=== AMB-17 ===
The AMB-17 is an integrally suppressed variant, chambered in 9×39mm cartridge.

== Users ==
- Russia: The AM-17 is in limited use with FSB, FSO, Russian National Guard, and VVS specifically for firearms testing.

== See also ==
- AK-12
- List of Russian weaponry
- List of equipment of the Russian Ground Forces
