= SR-3 Vikhr =

Russian compact assault rifle

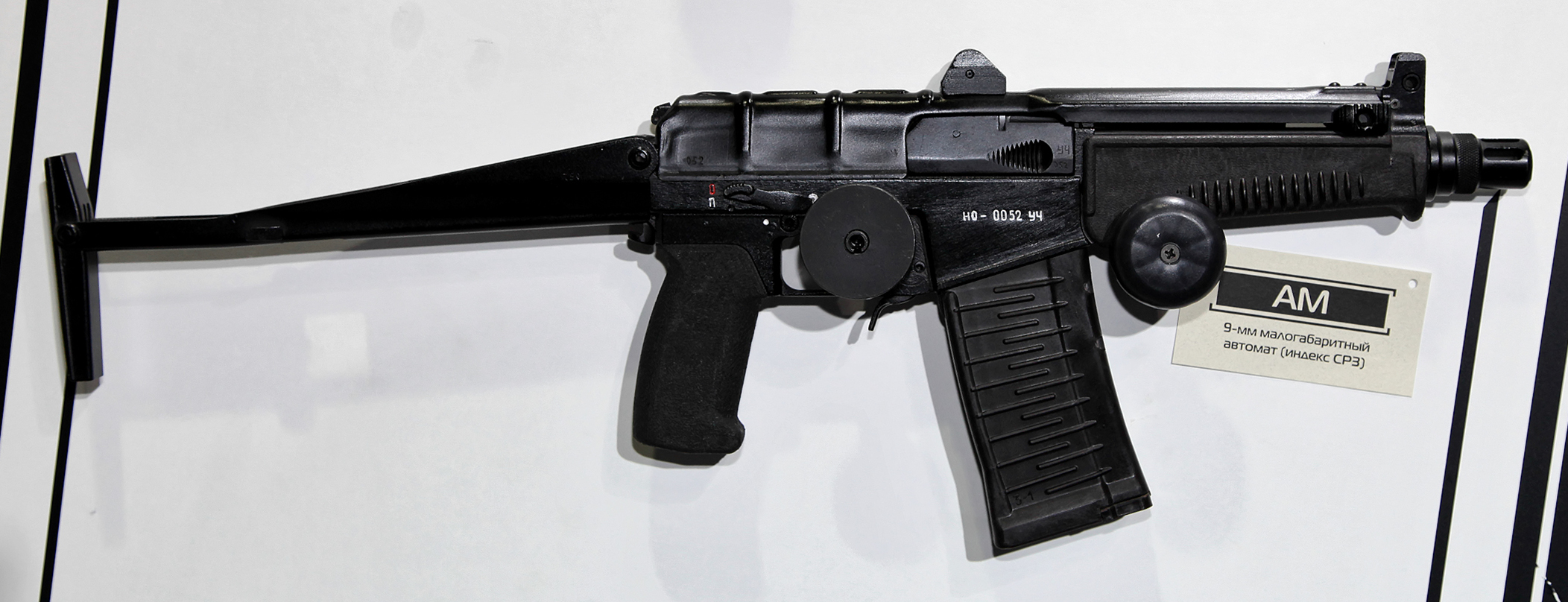
- SR-3 Vikhr on display with its former "AM" designation
- Type: Assault rifle Carbine
- Place of origin: Russia

Service history
- In service: 1996–present
- Used by: See Users

Production history
- Designer: TsNIITochMash
- Designed: 1989 - 1994
- Manufacturer: Tula Arms Plant
- Produced: since 1995
- Variants: See Variants

Specifications
- Mass: 2 kg (without a magazine) (SR-3); 2.2 kg (without a magazine), 3.2 kg (with an empty 30-round magazine and a suppressor) (SR-3M)
- Length: SR-3: 396 mm (15.59 inch): buttstock folded 640 mm (25.2 inch): buttstock extended SR-3M: 410 mm (16.14 inch): buttstock folded 675 mm (26.57 inch): buttstock extended 700 mm (27.56 inch): buttstock folded with suppressor 970 mm (38.19 inch): buttstock extended with suppressor
- Barrel length: 156 mm (6.14 inch)
- Cartridge: 9×39mm
- Action: Gas operated, Rotating bolt
- Rate of fire: 700–900 rounds/min
- Muzzle velocity: 295 m/s
- Effective firing range: 200 m
- Maximum firing range: 400 m
- Feed system: 10-, 20-, 30-round detachable magazine
- Sights: Iron Sights and various optical sights by the use of a Dovetail rail mount

The SR-3 Vikhr (Russian: СР-3 «Вихрь»; Специальная Разработка-3, romanized: Spetsialnaya razrabotka «Vikhr», lit. 'Special Development' "Whirlwind"), previously designated as the AM Vikhr; Avtomat Malogabaritnyj "Vikhr", lit. 'Small-sized Automatic Rifle'), is a Russian 9×39mm compact assault rifle. It was developed by A. D. Borisov, V. N. Levchenko and A. Tyshlykov at TsNIITochMash (Central Institute for Precision Machine Building) in the early 1990s and was manufactured in 1994. Heavily based on the AS Val, but which lacks the integral suppressor design, it has a redesigned folding stock and charging handle for ease of concealed carry.

Due to the high cost to manufacture the SR-3 Vikhr, it was not mass-produced for the Russian military. Instead, it was used by the Russian Special Operations Forces (Spetsnaz) and Russian Federal Security Officers.

== History ==
After the adoption of the SR-3 Vikhr, the FSB established new operational requirements with a goal to combine the qualities of the SR-3, AS Val and VSS Vintorez, resulting in a new variant designated as the SR-3M (СР-3М).

== Design ==
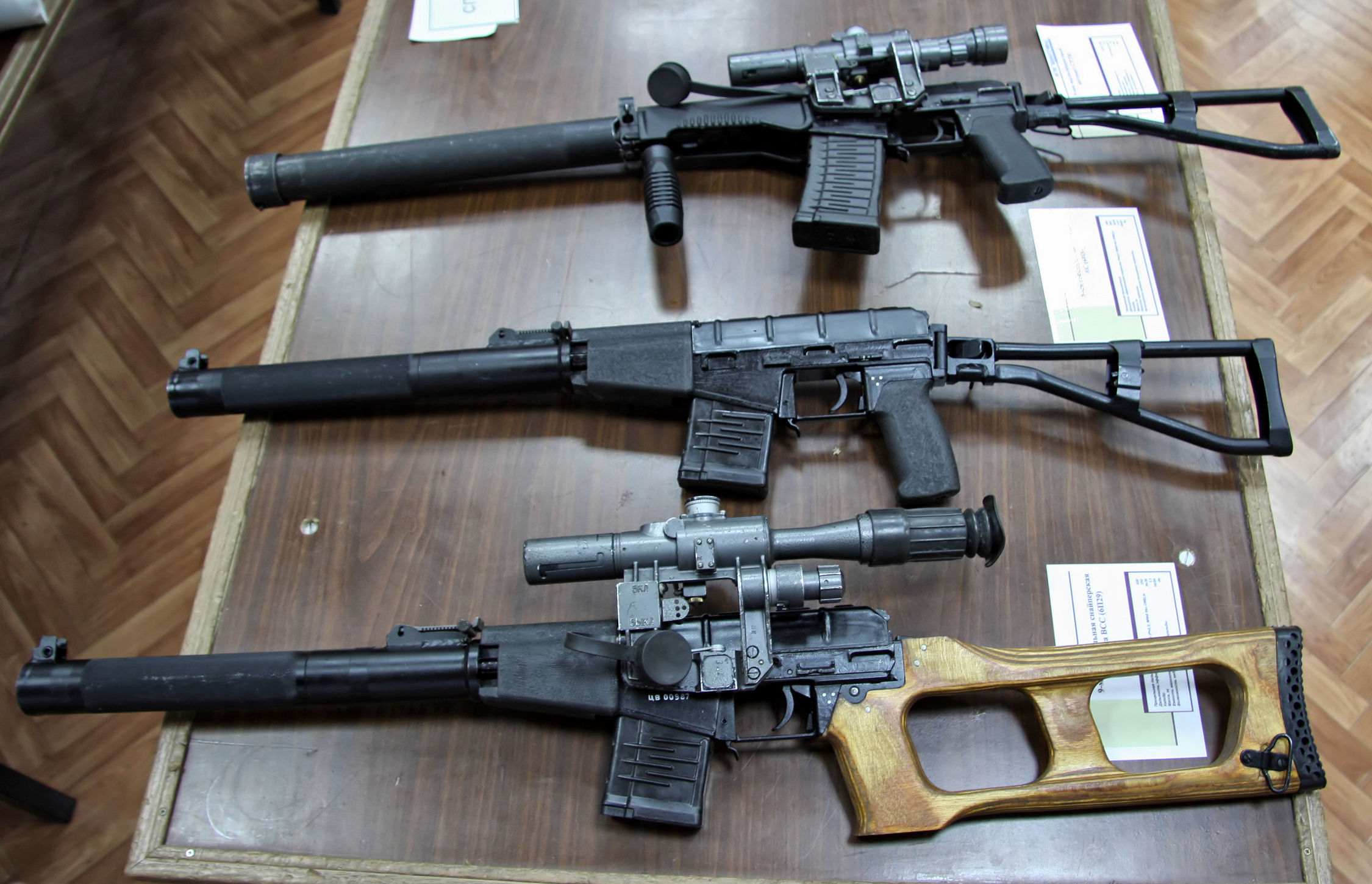
SR-3M (top), AS Val (middle) and VSS Vintorez (bottom)

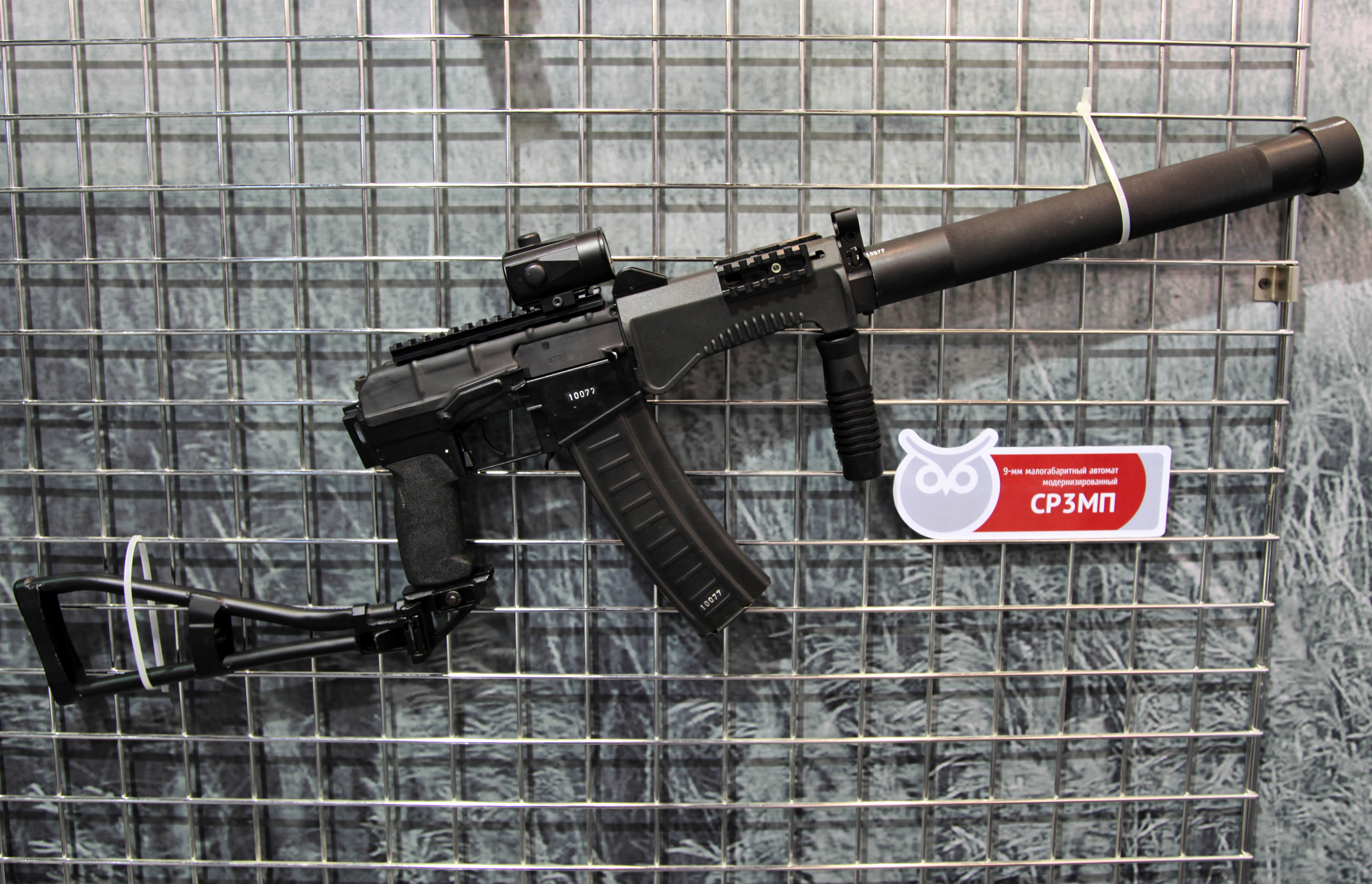
SR-3MP with an optical sight, suppressor, and Its buttstock attached underneath the pistol grip

The SR-3 Vikhr is a compact assault rifle chambered in the 9×39mm subsonic cartridge. It is primarily used with the SP-6 armour piercing ammunition with a hardened steel penetrator, that can penetrate a 6mm steel plate at a range of 200 metres. Alongside the SP-6, a lower cost SP-5 ball ammunition with a heavy bullet and PAB-9 ammunition is also used. The SR-3 is based on the AS Val, but lacks the integral suppressor. As a result, it is much more compact than the AS Val.

The SR-3 Vikhr is a select fire, gas-operated action with a long stroke piston. It uses the same rotating bolt group from the AS Val, and fires from a closed bolt. It has a more compact, top-folding buttstock and a simplified flip-up rear sight which can be set for 100 metres or 200 metres distance compared to the AS Val. The redesigned charging handle, made in the form of dual sliders above the forearm, must be grasped by the thumb and index finger and then retracted to chamber a round. The trigger unit is generally the same as in the AS Val, but the AK-type safety is replaced by an ambidextrous lever above the pistol grip. The fire mode selector is of cross-bolt, a push button type and located behind the trigger, inside the trigger guard.

== Variants ==
=== SR-3M ===
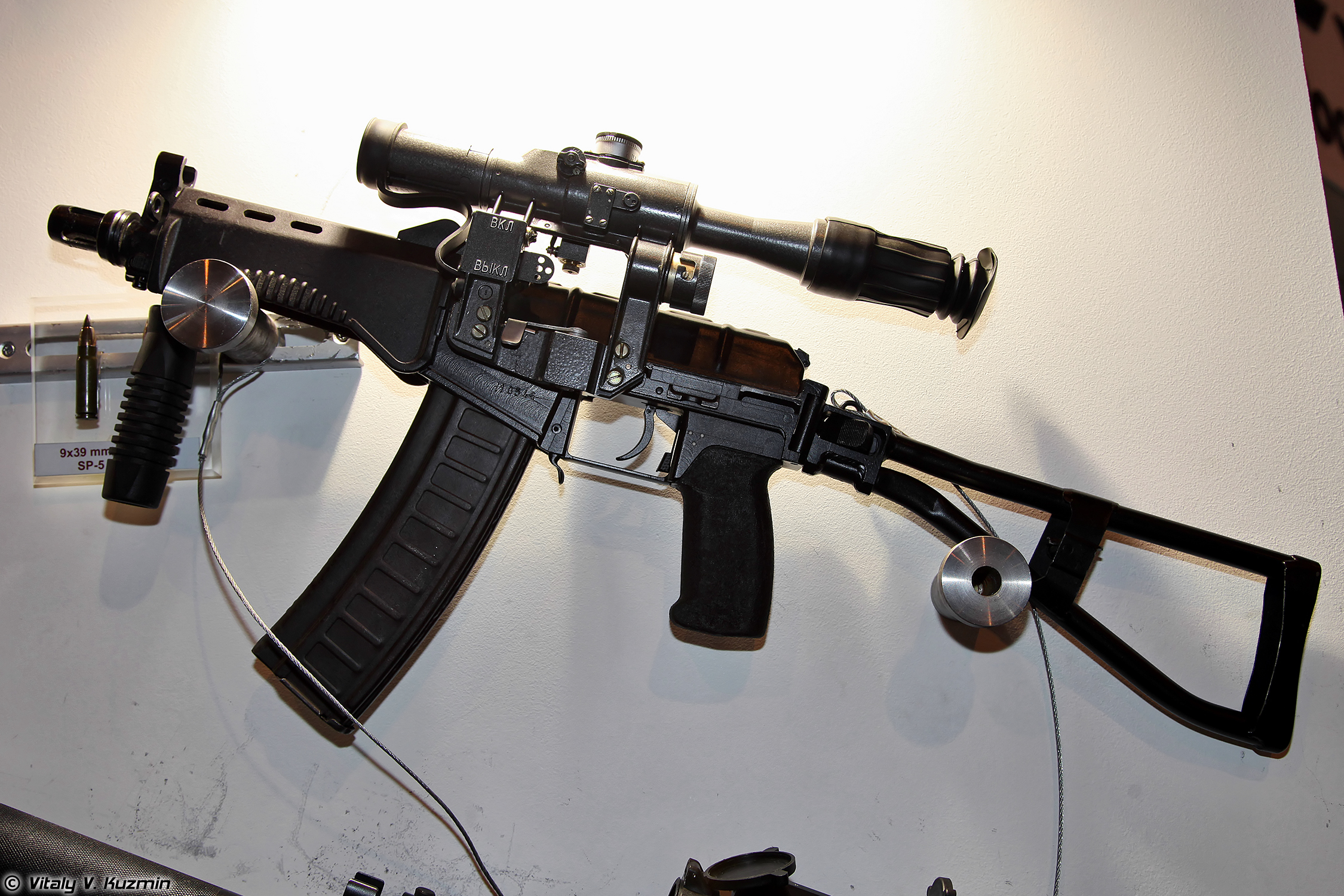
SR-3M equipped with a PSO-1 scope

The SR-3M is a modernised variant of the SR-3 Vikhr. It has improved polymer furniture, a more convenient charging handle, AS-style controls (safety lever, semi-automatic/full automatic selector switch is inside the trigger guard), an AS-style side-folding stock, a redesigned handguard with a folding foregrip and where the rear sight is now located, a specially developed quick-detachable suppressor, a Warsaw Pact rail mount, and a new magazine with a 30-round capacity which provides a more reliable feeding during fully-automatic fire whilst still compatible with the 10- and 20-round magazines from the SR-3, AS Val and the VSS Vintorez. The 30-round magazine is also compatible with the AS Val and VSS Vintorez. It was ordered in May 2021 by an unnamed foreign country.

=== SR-3MP ===
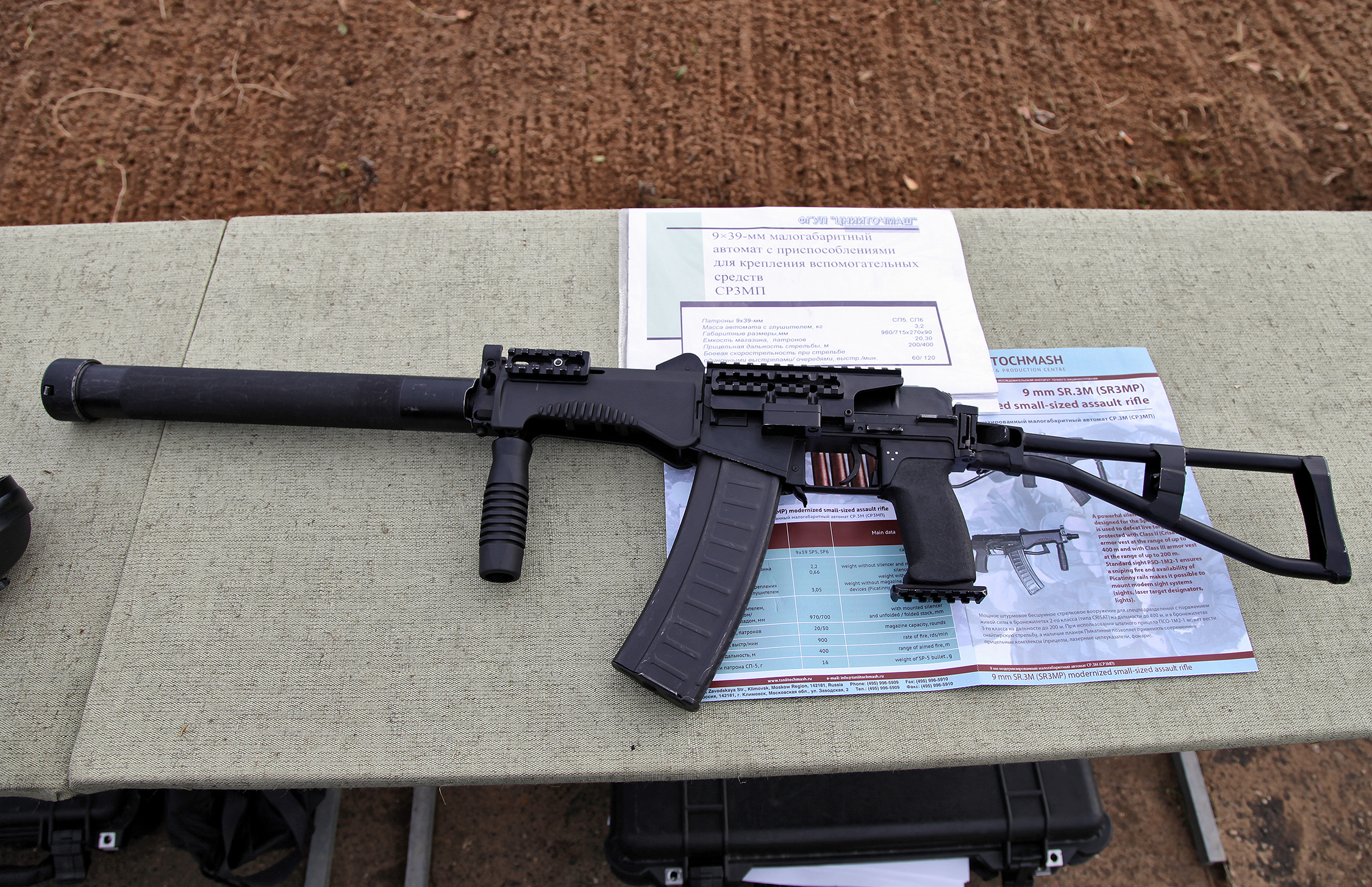
SR-3MP with its technical data spreadsheet

The SR-3MP is a further development of the SR-3M. It features a new Dovetail rail mount for mounting various optical sights. The handguard has two Picatinny rails on each side for mounting laser sights, tactical flashlights, and other tactical accessories. An additional rail is added below the pistol grip for the folding stock to be mounted for operators who wear a full-face shield mask, bullet-proof helmet, or night vision gear to still be able to aim by the shoulder without the stock getting in the way.

== Gallery ==
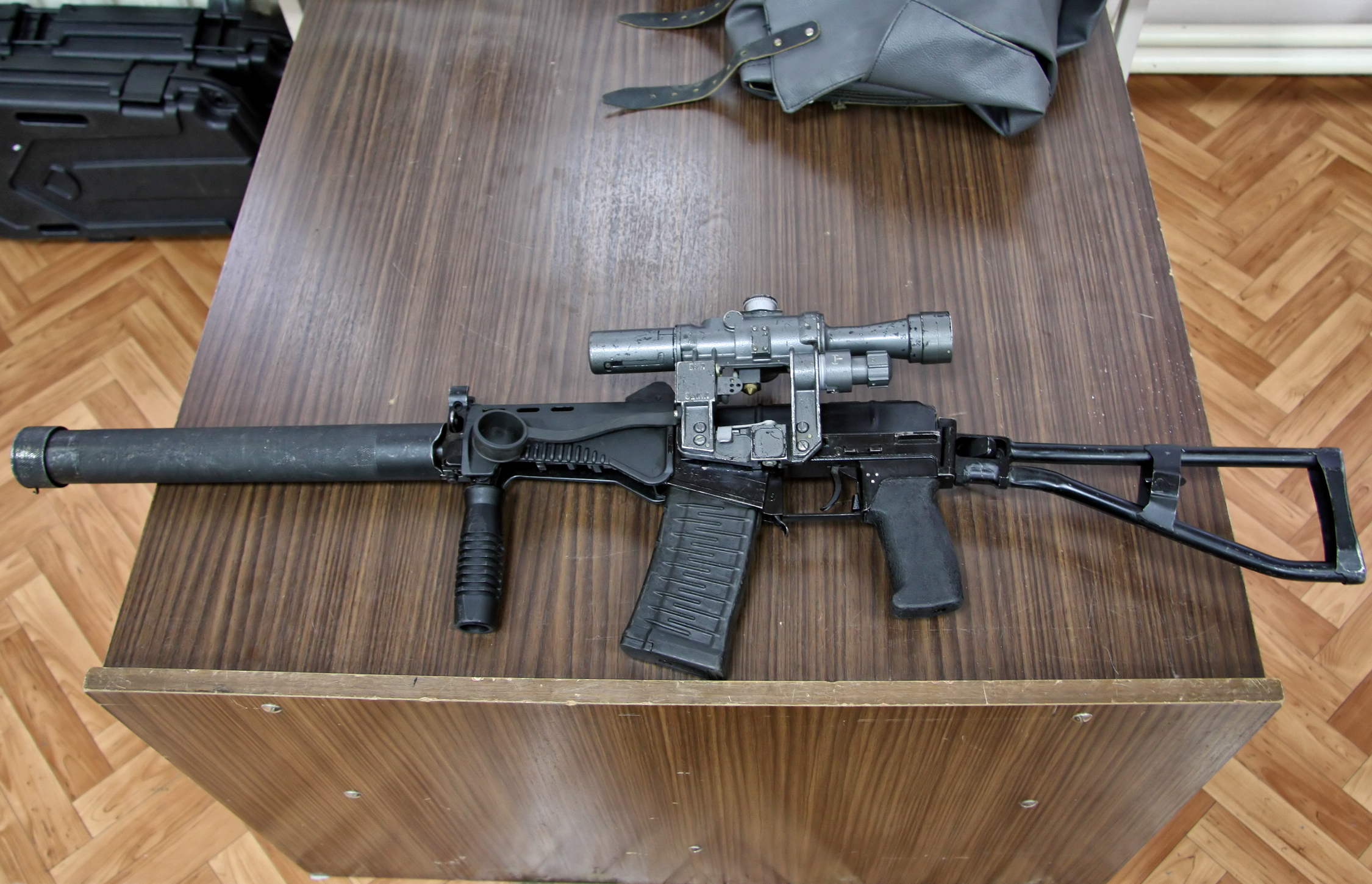
A left-side view of the SR-3M

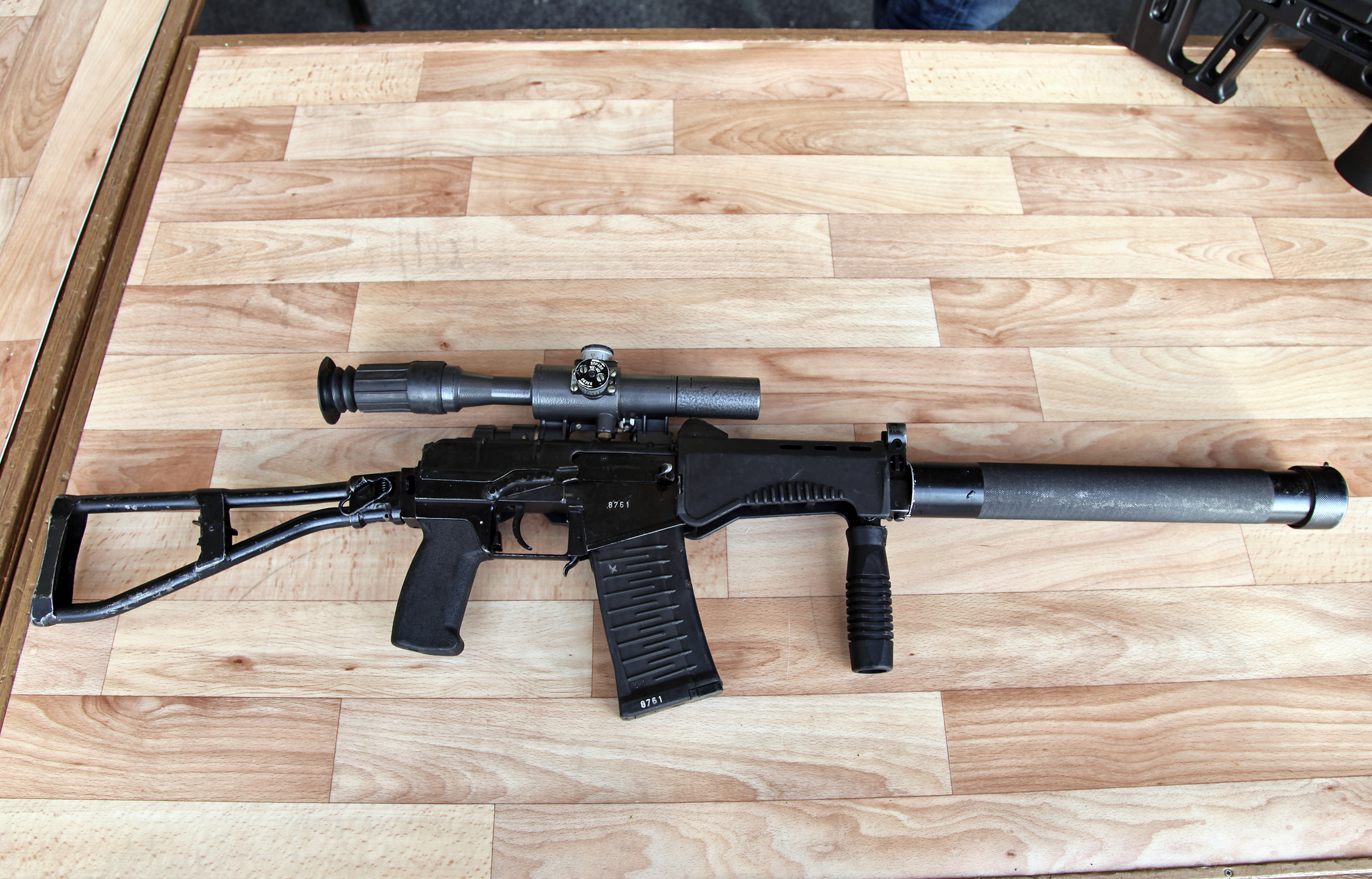
A right-side view of the SR-3M

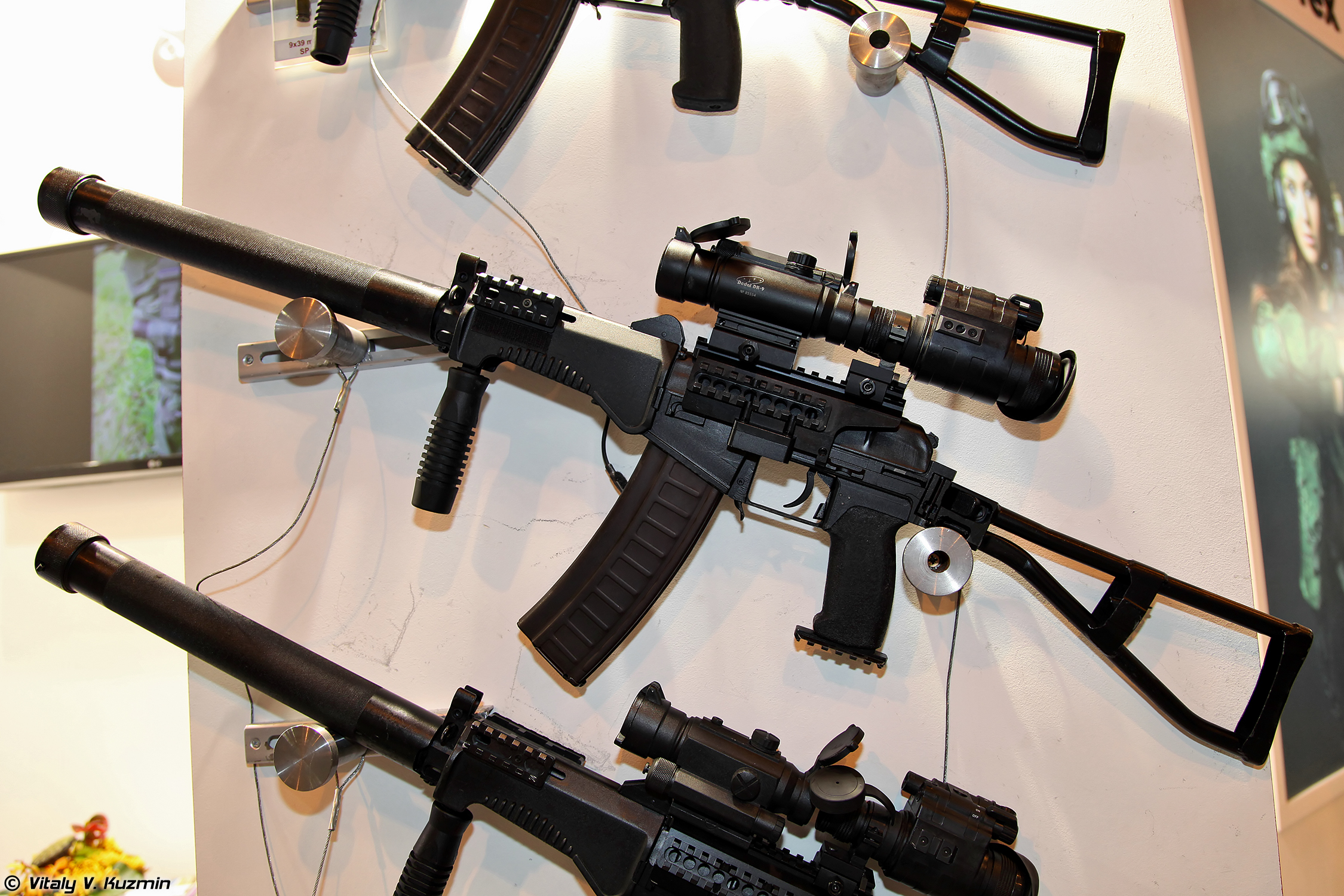
SR-3MP with a suppressor and an optical sight attached to its new Dovetail rail mount

== Users ==
Russia: Used by the Federal Security Service.

== See also ==
- 9A-91
- AK-9
- Kalashnikov Concern AMB-17
- OTs-12 Tiss
- OTs-14 Groza
- VSK-94
- List of Russian weaponry
- List of assault rifles
