= VSK-94 =

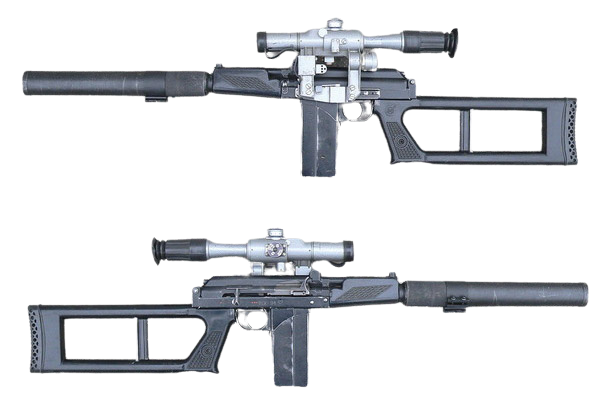
- VSK-94 with a PSO-1 optical sight
- Type: Designated marksman rifle
- Place of origin: Russia

Service history
- In service: 1994–present
- Used by: Various Spetsnaz units, Mainly law enforcement units.
- Wars: Second Chechen War; Russo-Georgian War; Syrian Civil War

Production history
- Designer: KBP Instrument Design Bureau, Vasily Gryazev
- Designed: 1994
- Manufacturer: Tula Arms Plant
- Produced: 1994
- Variants: 9A-91

Specifications
- Mass: 2.8 kg (6.17 lb)
- Length: 932 mm (36.7 in)
- Barrel length: 230 mm (9.1 in)
- Width: 83 mm (3.3 in)
- Height: 280 mm (11.0 in)
- Cartridge: 9×39mm: SP5, SP6, PAB-9, SPP, BP
- Action: Gas-operated, rotating bolt
- Rate of fire: 700 rounds/min
- Muzzle velocity: 270 m/s
- Effective firing range: 400 m
- Maximum firing range: 600 m
- Feed system: 20-round detachable box magazine
- Sights: PSO-1 and other optical sights by the use of a "Dovetail mount", fixed back-up iron sights

The VSK-94 (Russian: ВСК-94: Войсковой Снайперский Комплекс, romanized: Voyskovoy Snayperskiy Kompleks, lit. 'Military Sniper Complex', GRAU index 6В8) is a 9×39mm designated marksman rifle variant of the 9A-91 assault rifle, designed in 1995 in the KBP Instrument Design Bureau by Vasily Gryazev and manufactured by Tula Arms Plant.

The VSK-94 was meant to be a cheaper alternative to the VSS "Vintorez". Unlike the VSS, the suppressor of the VSK-94 is not an integrated design.

== Design details ==
The VSK-94 is chambered in the 9×39mm cartridge. It retains the gas operated, rotating bolt with 4 lugs which utilises the long stroke gas piston operating system of the 9A-91.

The VSK-94 features a stamped steel receiver, a skeletonised polymer stock integrated with a pistol grip, a synthetic handguard, and feeds from a 20-round detachable box magazine from the 9A-91.

The VSK-94 is primarily equipped with a 4× PSO-1 optical sight (optimised for subsonic rounds shooting), and back-up iron sights from the 9A-91. The threaded barrel is designed to use a specially designed suppressor.

Since the 9×39mm cartridge weighs about twice as much as that of the 9×19mm Parabellum, its muzzle energy is about twice as high as that of a subsonic 9×19mm Parabellum cartridge fired from an HK MP5SD.

== Gallery ==
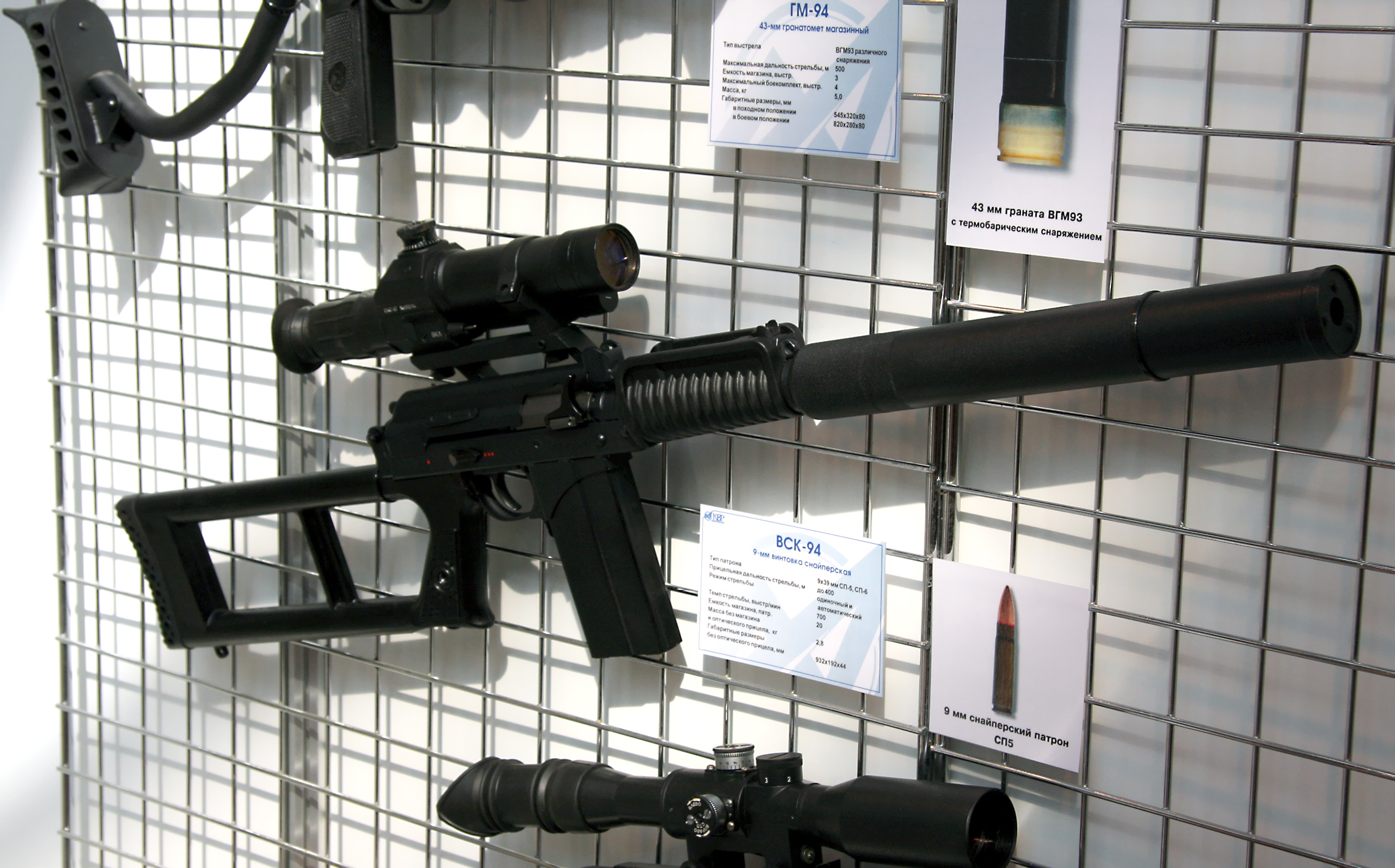
VSK-94 displayed at IDELF 2008

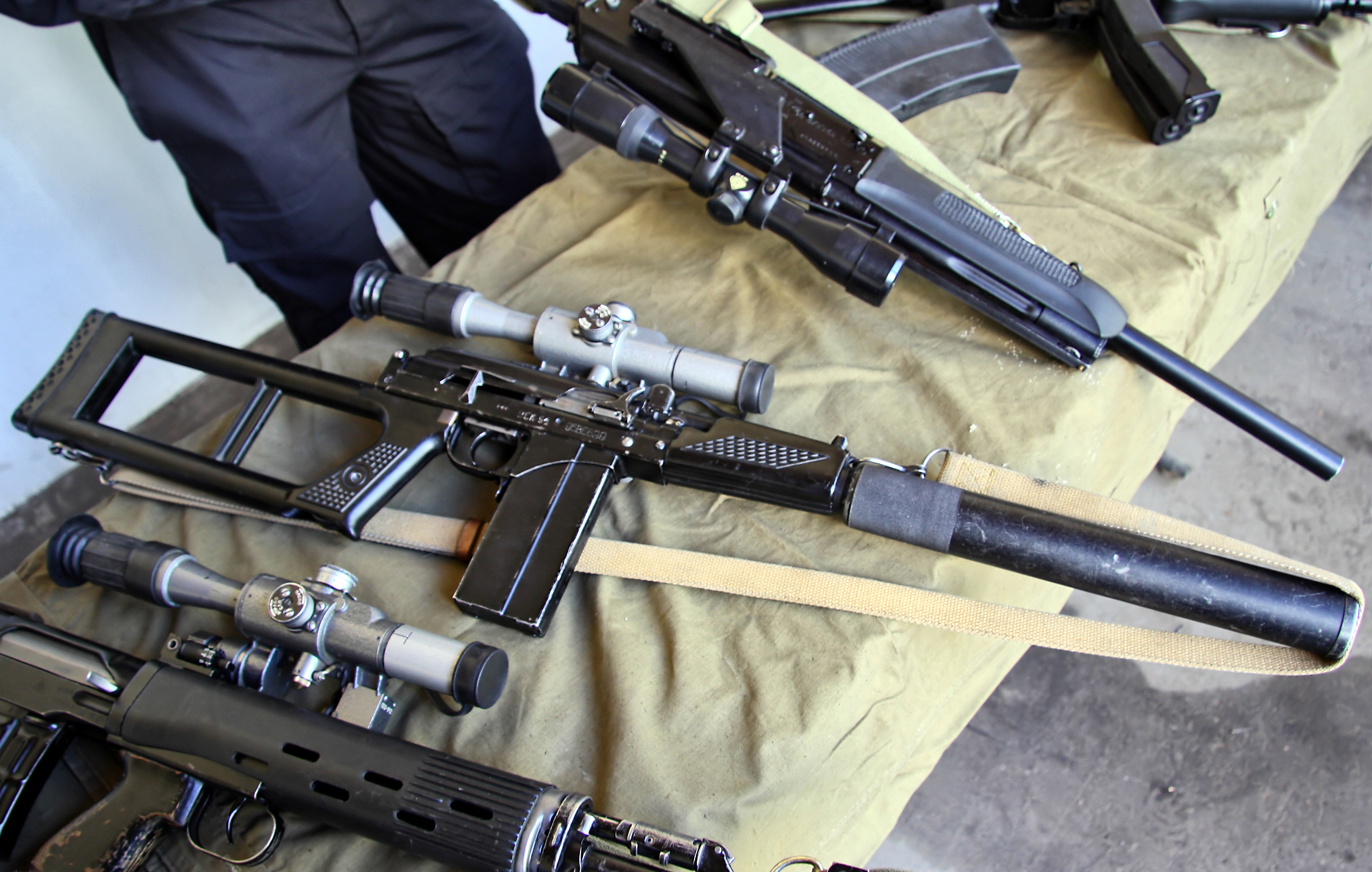
VSK-94 with an early handguard design

== Users ==
- Belarus: Used by the Belarusian special forces.
- India: Used by MARCOS.
- Russia: Used by Various Spetsnaz units, Federal Security Service (FSB) and OMON.
- Syria: Used by Syrian Republican Guard and special forces.

== See also ==
- 9A-91
- OTs-12 Tiss
- OTs-14 Groza
- SR-3 Vikhr
- List of Russian weaponry
