= 9A-91 =

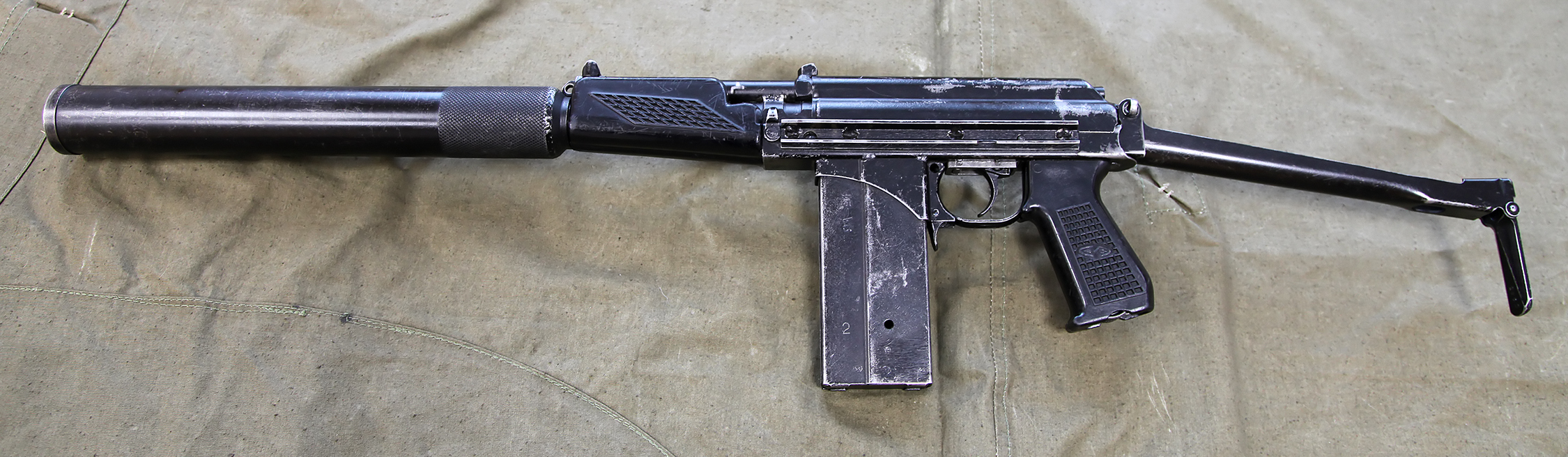
- 9A-91 compact assault rifle with a sound suppressor attached and the stock unfolded
- Type: Assault rifle
- Place of origin: Russia

Service history
- In service: 1993–present
- Used by: Russia (police and Federal Security Service)
- Wars: Syrian Civil War

Production history
- Designer: KBP Instrument Design Bureau
- Designed: 1991
- Manufacturer: KBP Instrument Design Bureau
- Produced: 1994–present
- Variants: VSK-94

Specifications
- Mass: 1.8 kg (empty); 2.5 kg (loaded with 20-round magazine)
- Length: 594 mm (stock extended); 373 mm (stock folded)
- Width: 44 mm
- Height: 190 mm
- Cartridge: 9x39mm (SP-5, SP-6 & PAB-9)
- Caliber: 9mm
- Action: Gas actuated, rotating bolt
- Rate of fire: 600-800 rounds/min
- Muzzle velocity: 270 m/s
- Effective firing range: 200 m
- Maximum firing range: 400 m (with an optical sight mounted)
- Feed system: 20-round straight box magazine
- Sights: Iron sights or PSO-1, Kobra RDS, PK-AS

The 9A-91 is a compact assault rifle currently in use with Russian police forces. It is used as a cheaper and more versatile alternative to the SR-3 "Vikhr".

The 9A-91 is a gas operated, rotating bolt weapon, which utilizes a long stroke gas piston, located above the barrel, and a rotating bolt with 4 lugs. The receiver is made from steel stampings; the forend and pistol grip are made from polymer. The steel buttstock folds up and above the receiver when not in use. The charging handle is welded to the right side of the bolt carrier on earlier production guns, with current production guns having a charging hand that folds up, making the gun more low profile by decreasing the chances of the charging handle snagging onto clothing and equipment. Earlier production models of the 9A-91 featured the safety / fire selector lever at the left side of the receiver, above the trigger guard. Current production models feature the safety / fire selector lever at the right side and a sight mounting rail on the left side of the receiver. This allows the user to attach various scopes and red-dots onto the rail to aid in aiming the weapon. The fire selector allows for semi and fully-automatic fire. The flip-up rear sight has settings for 100 and 200 meters range, but the relatively short sight base and steep trajectory of the subsonic bullet effectively restricts the 9A-91 to ranges of about 100 meters.

The VSK-94 is a sniper rifle based on the 9A-91.

== Gallery ==
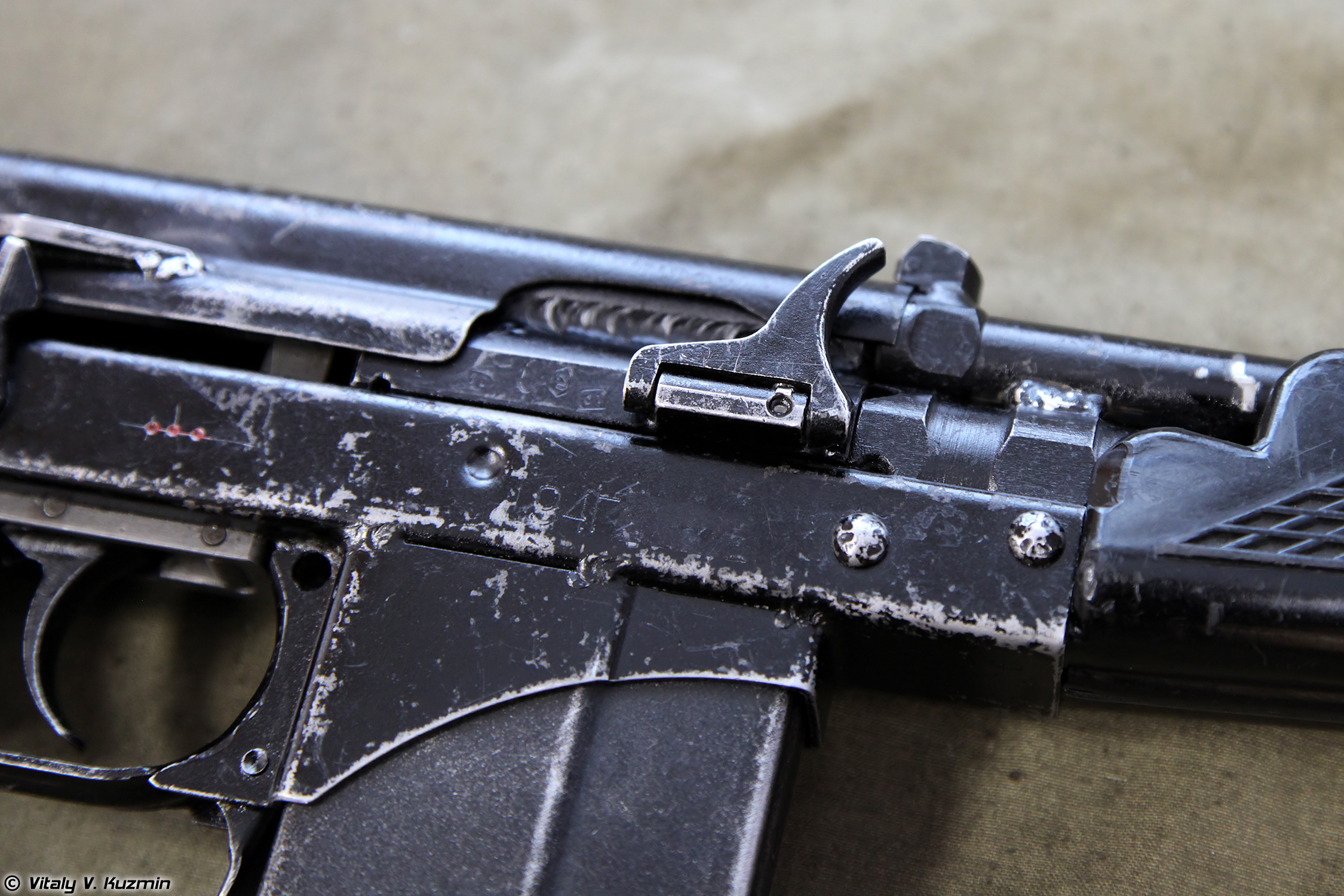
Charging handle in the folded up position

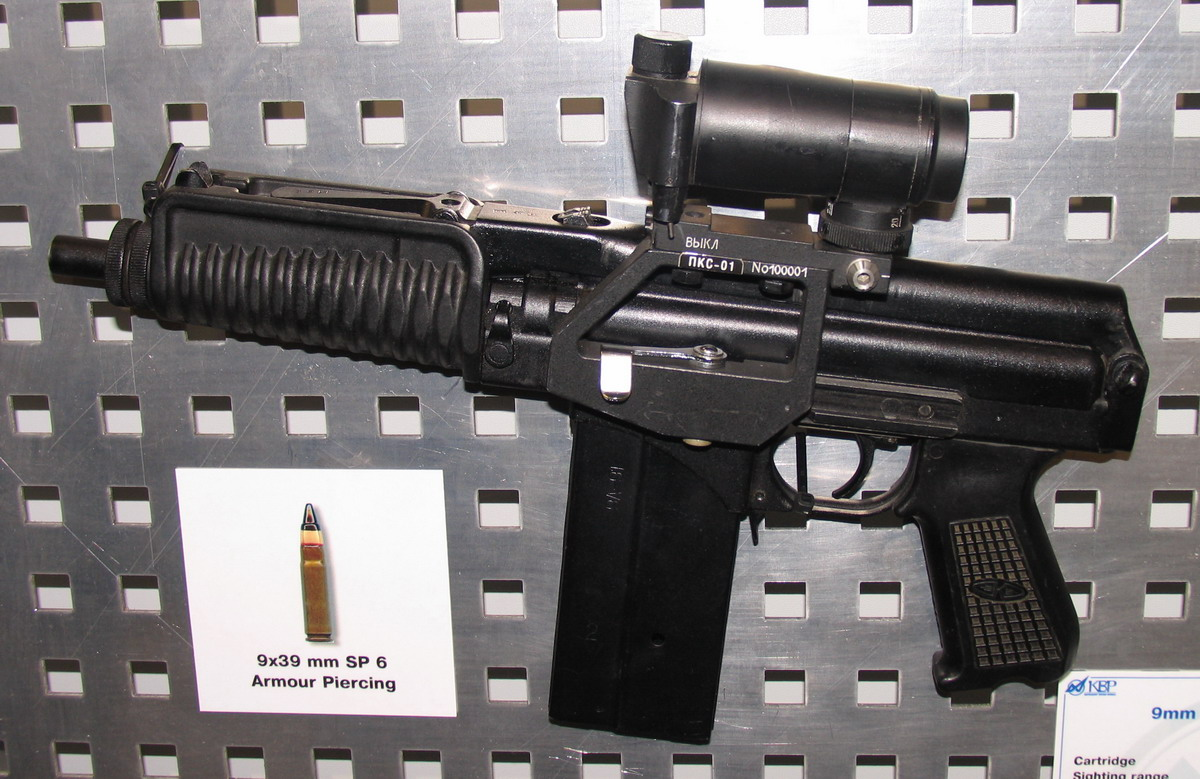
Modernised 9A-91

== Users ==
- Russia: Used by OSN Saturn
- Belarus
- Kyrgyzstan
- Mongolia
- Syria
- Laos

== See also ==
- KBP A-91
- AS Val
- OC-14-4A
- TKB-022
- List of Russian weaponry
