= AK-9 =

Russian assault rifle

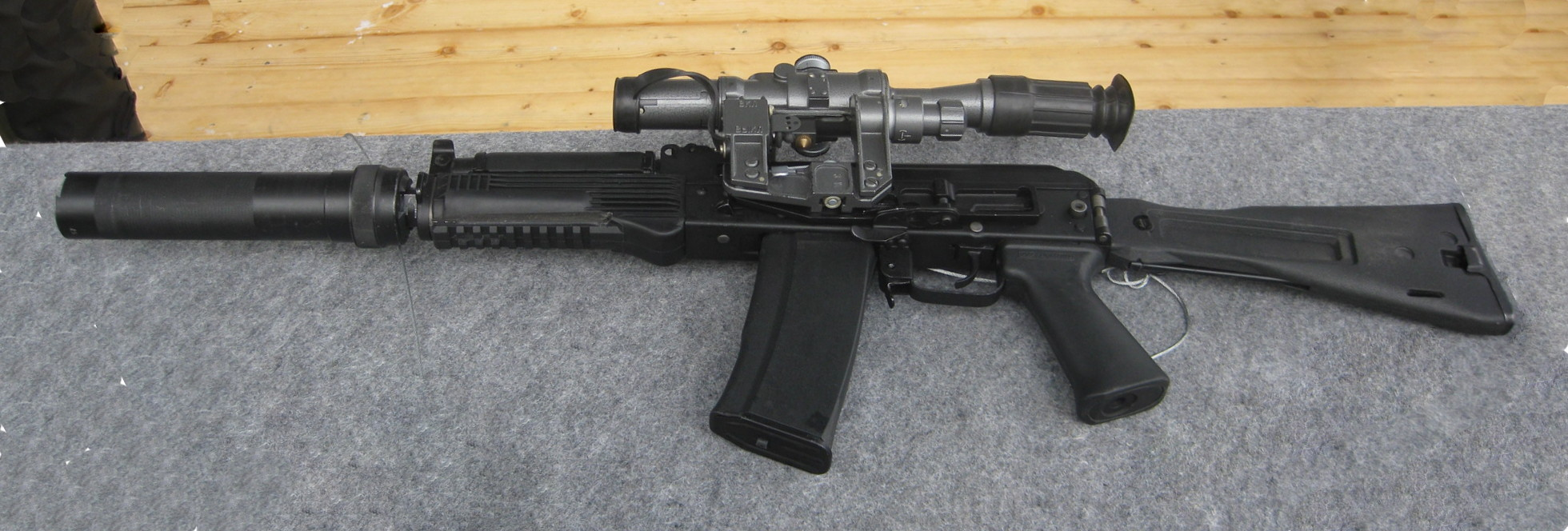
- A left-side view of the AK-9 with a suppressor equipped
- Type: Assault rifle Carbine
- Place of origin: Russia

Service history
- In service: 2007–present
- Used by: See Users
- Wars: Syrian civil war

Production history
- Designer: Izhevsk machine-building plant
- Designed: Early 2000s
- Manufacturer: Izhevsk machine-building plant
- Produced: 2000s - Present? (potentially still in production)
- No. built: Few hundreds (limited usage)

Specifications
- Mass: 3.8 kg (8.38 lb) (empty)
- Length: 705 mm (27.8 in), 881 mm (34.7 in) (with suppressor), 465 mm (18.3 in) folded and without suppressor
- Barrel length: 200 mm (7.9 in)
- Cartridge: 9×39mm
- Action: Gas-operated, rotating bolt
- Rate of fire: 700–750 RPM
- Effective firing range: 400 meters
- Maximum firing range: 424 meters
- Feed system: 20-round detachable box magazine
- Sights: Iron sights and various optical sights by the use of Picatinny rail or Warsaw Pact rail

The AK-9 is a Russian 9×39mm compact rifle. Its development began when Izhevsk Machine-Building Plant (Izhmash), now known as Kalashnikov Concern started working on a new silent, flame-less, compact AK rifle in the early 2000s. When creating the new weapon, the manufacturers have tried to surpass all available competitors, such as the AS Val and SR-3M. The basis for the silent, flame-less shooting complex rifle was designated as the AK-9, where it uses a quick-detachable suppressor.

The AK-9 is primarily designed for special units of the Interior Ministry and the Russian Army. The Russian Special Forces wanted to develop a rifle that combines the reliability of the AK platform with the advantages of maneuverability and It is one of the latest models of the popular Kalashnikov rifle series. It is based on the AK-100 series, which is a modernization series of Kalashnikov assault rifles. A unique feature of the rifle is the use of the SP-5 and SP-6 special 9×39mm subsonic cartridges.

According to its characteristics it competes against the 9A-91, AS Val and SR-3M, but has seen limited use compared to these counterparts, which have already seen service in Russian military and police units.

== History ==
In 2006, Russian authorities wanted the Izhmash factory to design a rifle with Kalashnikov properties, but suitable to be used in special operations. Factory manager Vladimir Grodetsky stated that the rifle was for special forces for anti-terrorist operations. Alexei Dragunov, one of the designers of the AK-9, says "It shoots virtually without a sound and it can go through a bullet-proof vest". The AK-9 is also lighter than earlier Kalashnikov models.

From the Vladimir Zlobin interview in February 2013:

We are working on an entire line of various small arms based on the AK-12. These would be submachine guns and compact assault rifles, automatic carbines and hand-held machine guns. On the basic AK-12 platform a series of special-purpose weapons is being developed. For example, the AK-9 was transferred to this platform. The weapons are going to be tested this spring.

== Design ==
The AK-9 is based on the so-called "hundred series" of Kalashnikov assault rifles, such as the AK-104, but with certain improvements. It is a selective fire compact assault rifle chambered in 9×39mm subsonic cartridge.

The AK-9 features the same tried and proven gas operated, rotary bolt action, and same "Kalashnikov-style" controls including reciprocating bolt handle, safety/fire selector lever and overall layout with side-folding polymer buttstock. The Polymer furniture is improved with the addition of accessories such as a Picatinny rail on the bottom of the forend and the left side of the receiver is fitted with a Warsaw Pact rail. The barrel can be fitted with a specially designed quick-detachable suppressor (sound moderator), which is especially effective with the 9×39mm subsonic cartridge. The magazine is made of black polymer, holds 20 rounds of ammunition and appears to be of proprietary design, making it not compatible with other (competing) weapons of the same caliber, which are already in service with Russian military and law enforcement.

The AK-9 supports wide range of attachments such as a mounted grenade launcher, laser sights, tactical lights and other tactical accessories. The trigger mechanism allows it to fire in semi-automatic fire and fully automatic fire. The firing module is similar to that of the Kalashnikov assault rifle and is located on the right side of the weapon.

== Users ==
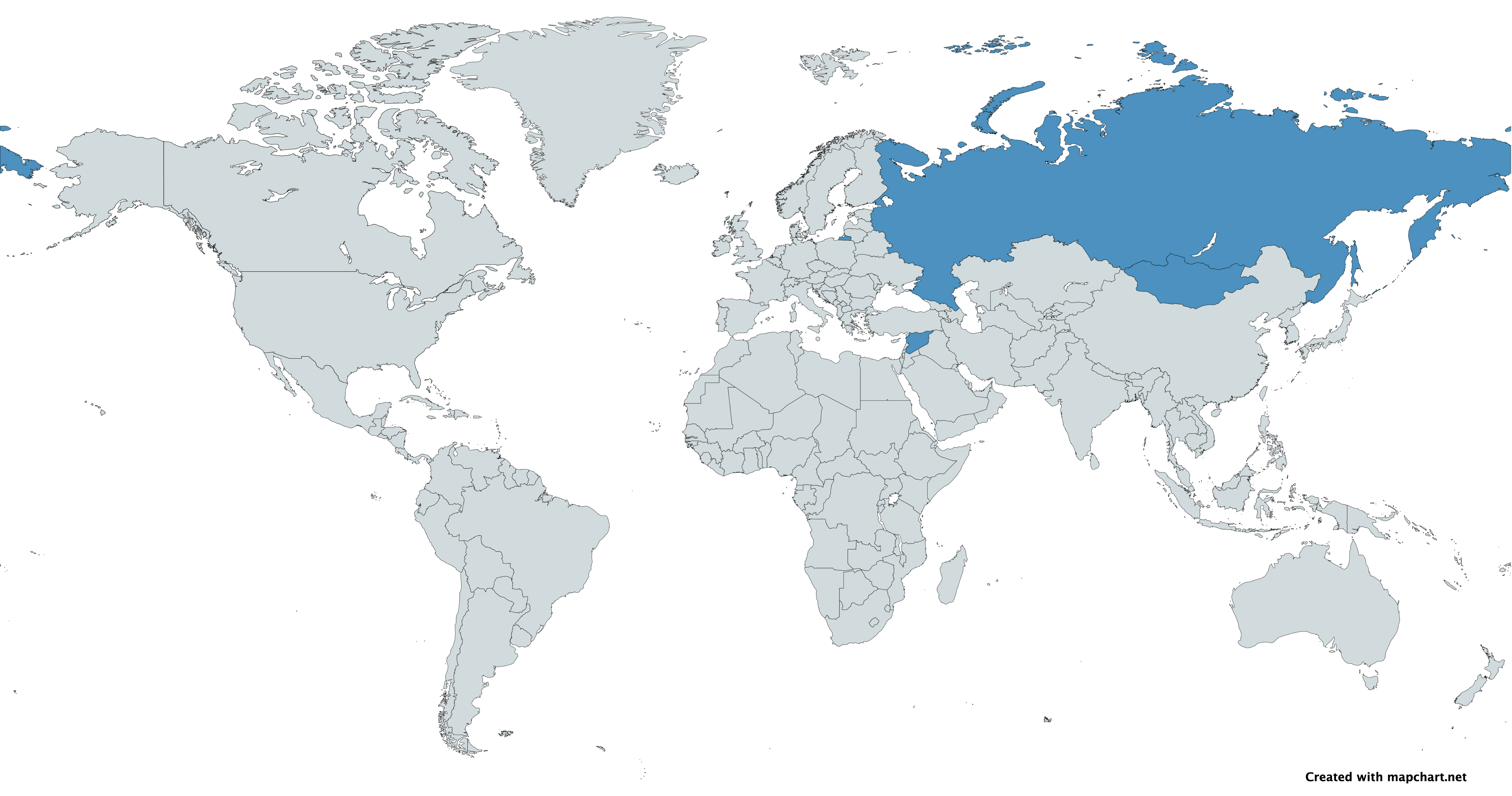
Map with AK-9 users in blue

- Mongolia: Used by the Mongolian Armed Forces and Police, S.W.A.T.
- Russia: In very limited usage.
- Syria: Used by the Syrian Army and Police.
