= OTs-12 Tiss =

OTs-12
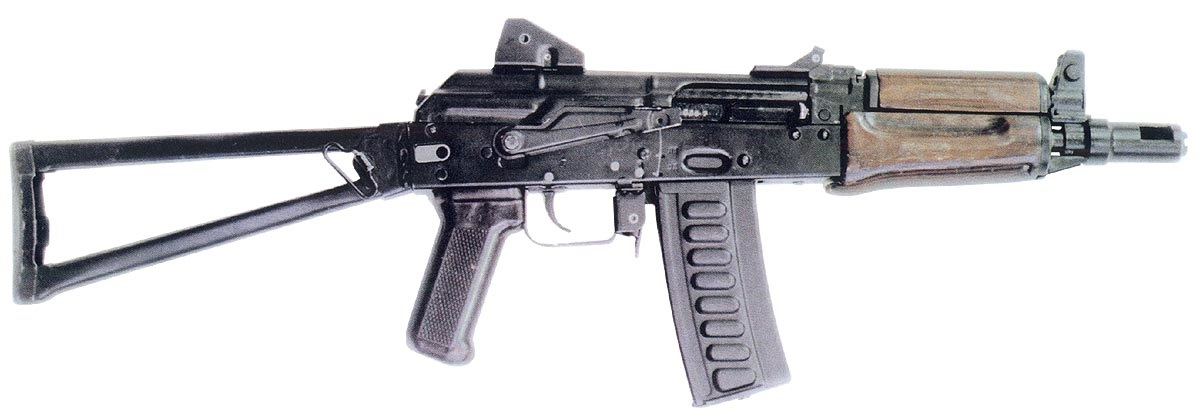
- The OTs-12
- Type: Assault rifle Carbine
- Place of origin: Russia

Production history
- Designer: V. N. Telesh and U. V. Lebedev
- Designed: Early 1990s
- Manufacturer: TsKIIB SOO (Central Design Bureau of Sporting and Hunting Weapons)
- Produced: 1993
- No. built: 350

Specifications
- Mass: 2.5 kg (empty)
- Length: 730 mm 490 mm (folded)
- Barrel length: 206.5 mm
- Cartridge: 9×39mm
- Rate of fire: 800 rounds/min
- Muzzle velocity: 270 m/s (890 ft/s)
- Effective firing range: about 200 m (220 yd)
- Maximum firing range: 400 m (440 yd)
- Feed system: 20-round detachable box magazine 25-round magazine (experimental)
- Sights: Iron sights

The OTs-12 Tiss (Russian: ОЦ-12 "Тисс", lit. 'Yew') is a Russian fully automatic compact assault rifle. It is chambered for the subsonic 9×39mm round.

The Tiss is meant to equip OMON and SOBR units in CQB-based operations.

== History ==
The rifle was developed in the early 1990s in TsKIB SOO of Tula designers VN Telesh and Yu.V.Lebedev. It is basically an AKS-74U re-chambered for 9×39mm, it was designed as alternative to the AKS-74U. The TsKIB COO of Tula made several hundred of OTs-12s, which were transferred to the Interior Ministry security forces.

Despite the good evaluation, the Tula Arms Plant did not put the rifle into mass-production. They instead opted for a bullpup configuration known as OTs-14 Groza, which became its successor.

In 2018, a replica of the Tiss was reported to be designed by Daniel Fisher of KNS Precision.

== Design ==
The main design changes from the AKS-74U are in the bolt, barrel, muzzle-brake, and magazine. Early versions were made with a long barrel.

The 20-round box magazine was designed so that it would be compatible with standard current-issue ammo pouches, but a larger 25-round magazine was in early production until its cancellation.

The subsonic round showed superior penetration of cover at short and medium ranges (200–300 m) when compared to the 5.45×39mm.

Criticism was placed on the Tiss since a user cannot clean the gas outlet.

== See also ==
- AK-9
- OTs-14 Groza
- SR-3 Vikhr
- 9A-91
