= 9×39mm =

Soviet subsonic rifle cartridge

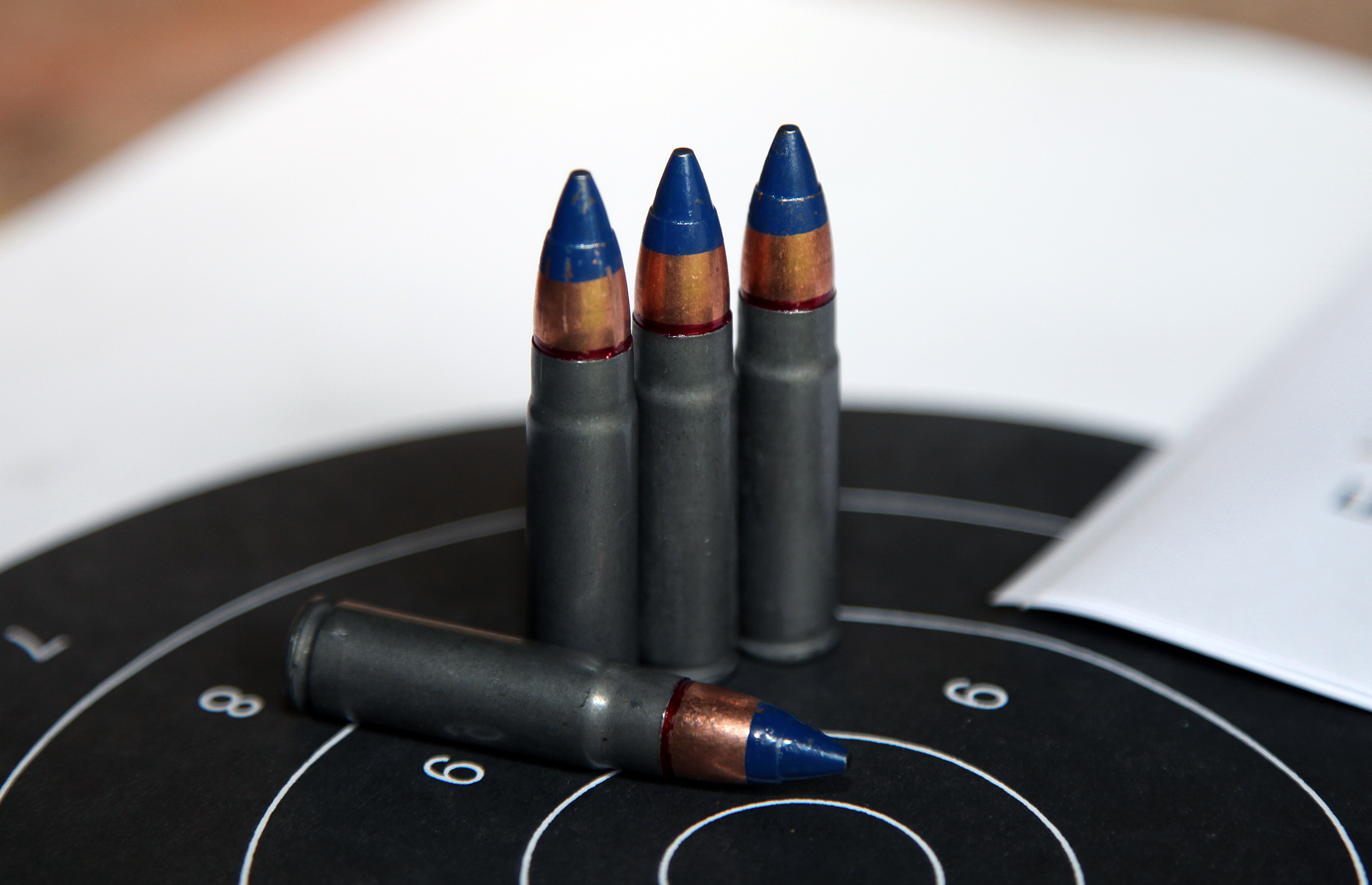
- 9×39 mm SPP (7N9) cartridges with blue-tip armor-piercing bullets
- Type: Rifle cartridge
- Place of origin: Soviet Union (Now Russia)

Service history
- Wars: Chechnya, Georgia, Iraq, Ukraine

Production history
- Designer: N.V.Zabelin, L.S.Dvoryaninova, Y.Z.Frolov, E.S.Kornilovova
- Designed: finished in mid 1980s

Specifications
- Parent case: 7.62×39mm
- Case type: Rimless, bottleneck
- Bullet diameter: 9.27 mm (0.365 in)
- Land diameter: 9.00 mm (0.354 in)
- Neck diameter: 9.72 mm (0.383 in)
- Shoulder diameter: 10.70 mm (0.421 in)
- Base diameter: 11.33 mm (0.446 in)
- Rim diameter: 11.33 mm (0.446 in)
- Rim thickness: 1.50 mm (0.059 in)
- Case length: 38.70 mm (1.524 in)
- Overall length: 56.00 mm (2.205 in)
- Maximum pressure: 3550 bar (355 MPa, 51,488 psi)

Ballistic performance
Bullet mass/type	Velocity	Energy
16.1 g (248 gr) SP-5	290 m/s (950 ft/s)	677 J (499 ft⋅lbf)
18.0 g (278 gr) Wolf FMJ	327 m/s (1,073 ft/s)	964 J (711 ft⋅lbf)
16.2 g (250 gr) SP-6	305 m/s (1,000 ft/s)	754 J (556 ft⋅lbf)
- Test barrel length: 270 mm (10.5 in); Source: C.I.P. List of TDCC - Tab I - Rimless cartridges

The 9×39 mm is a Soviet rifle cartridge. The cartridge yields increased performance in shorter barrels and effective subsonic performance. It was designed as an exclusively subsonic round.

== History and design ==
The 9×39 is based on the Soviet 7.62×39mm case but with the neck expanded to fit a 9.27 mm bullet. The intent was to create a stealthy cartridge for the "Vintorez" and "Val" projects which required more power, range, and penetration than 7.62×39 US or 7,62×28 rounds tested at the time.

The round is originally designed to have an optimistic effective lethal range of 300 to 400 meters and a maximum penetration of up to 10 mm of steel at 100 m. Like the 5.45×39mm cartridge, the 9×39mm SP-5 features an air pocket in the tip, which increases its tendency to yaw or "keyhole" upon impact, thus increasing soft tissue damage in human targets. The armor-piercing SP-6 cartridge is more effective against light armor, vehicles, or light barrier targets.

Commercial Wolf and Tula brand Ammunition that was being imported into the United States was subsequently banned on September 7, 2021 by then president Joe Biden as part of sanctions against Russia for poisoning of Alexei Navalny.

Since many users in the U.S. had adopted the 9×39 round prior to the import ban, they are now forced to reload their own ammunition. However, multiple companies worldwide produce .365" and .366" bullets suitable for reloading 9×39 cases, including Hornady, Barnes, Nosler, Prvi Partizan, Lapua, and others.

Roswell Manufacturing has developed what they are calling the 9x39US, which has slightly different specifications from the original 9×39 according to C.I.P. standards.

== Variants ==
Cartridge	SP-5(7N8)	SP-5UZ	SP-6(7N9)	SP-6UCh	PAB-9	SPP	BP(7N12)
Type	Sniper	Test (increased charge)	Armor-piercing	Training	Armor-piercing	Sniper (increased penetration)	Armor-piercing
Bullet weight [g]	Up to 16.8		About 16		Up to 17.3		
Muzzle velocity [m/s]	280–320		280–290		280–305	280–320	280–310
Muzzle energy [J]	658–860				678–886		
Maximum penetration			Up to 8 mm of steel		Up to 8 mm of steel		

SP-5 (7N8) – The SP-5 (СП-5) (SP: Spetsialnyj Patron; "special cartridge") was developed by N. V. Zabelin, L. S. Dvoryaninova. It consists of conventional FMJ bullet with a mild steel and lead core. The primary goal of this version was to achieve accuracy.

SP-5UZ – The SP-5UZ (СП5-УЗ) is an SP-5 variant with an increased charge intended for a factory-specific strength testing of the weapons.

SP-6 (7N9) – The SP-6 (СП-6) was developed by Y. Z. Frolov and E. S. Kornilovova. It has a hardened steel armor-piercing core, designed to defeat body armor, which was being issued in the 1980s (such as PASGT). It can penetrate 2 mm (0.079 in) of steel at 500 meters or 6 mm (0.24 in) of steel, 2.8 mm (0.11 in) of titanium or 30 layers of Kevlar at 200 meters. At 100 meters it can penetrate 8 mm (0.31 in) of steel or GOST 3 rated body armor, while retaining enough power to inflict damage to a soft target behind it.

SP-6UCh – The SP-6Uch (СП-6Уч) is an SP-6 variant intended for training.

PAB-9 (7N12) – The SP-6's bullet is expensive to manufacture, so an attempt was made to make a lower-cost version of the cartridge. The PAB-9 (ПАБ-9) used a stamped rather than machined steel core. It was not accepted due to higher wear it caused to barrels. As of 2011, its usage by Russian troops is prohibited.

SPP – The SPP (СПП) (SPP: Snaiperskiy, Povishennaya Probivaemost; "sniper – increased penetration") is a sniper round with increased penetration.

BP – The BP (БП) (BP: Broneboinaya Pulya; "armor-piercing bullet") is an armor-piercing round. Three modernizations of PAB-9 were created under the designation of BP to remedy its unusable performance.

There is at least one civilian load of this cartridge based on the SP-6 design. It is used by civilian 9×39mm firearms such as the (touted) civilian variant of RSh-9, MTs-570.

== Weapons ==
- 9A-91
- AK-9
- AS "Val", VSS "Vintorez"
- OTs-12 "Tiss"
- OTs-14-4A "Groza"
- SR-3, SR-3M "Vikhr"
- VSK-94
- AMB-17

== See also ==
- 12.7×55mm STs-130
- 8.6mm Blackout
- .338 Whisper
- .350 Legend

== Bibliography ==
- Jane's Infantry Weapons 1997–98 (23rd ed.). Coulsdon, UK: Jane's Information Group. 1997. p. 458. ISBN 0-7106-1548-5.
