= PSO-1 =

Russian telescopic sight

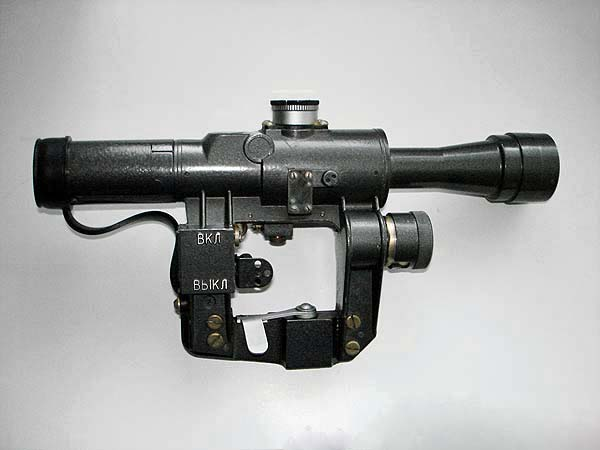
Russian PSO-1M2 current military issue 4×24 telescopic sight

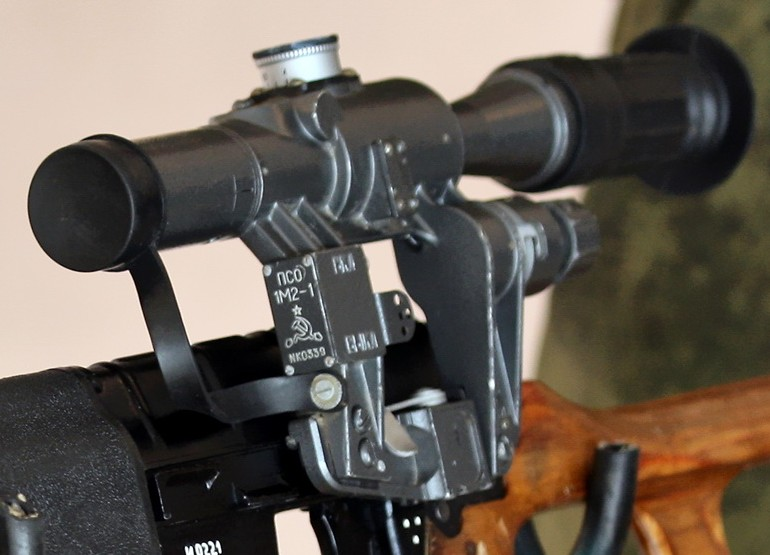
Frontal view showing the designation PSO-1M2-1

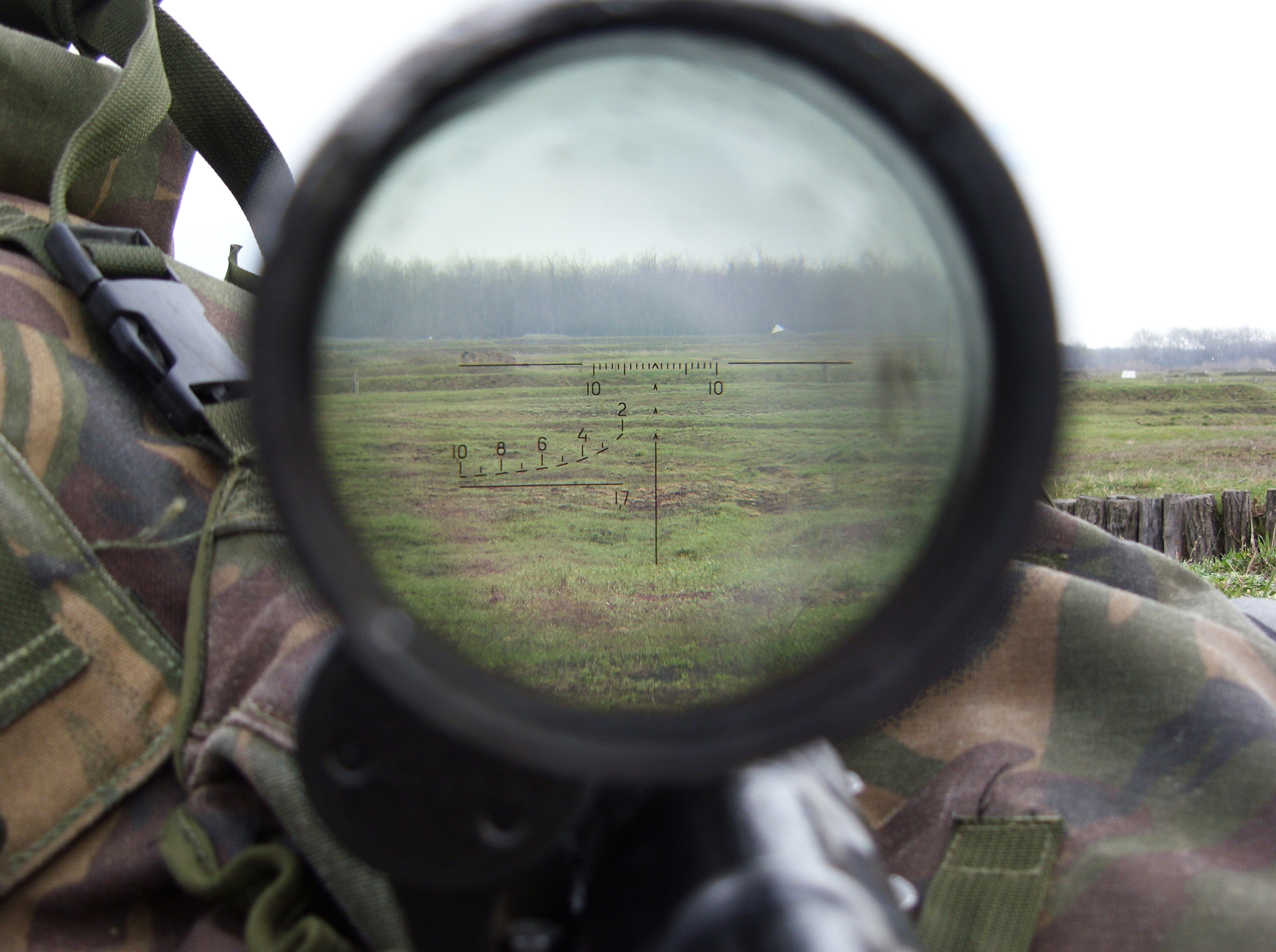
View through a PSO-1 telescopic sight mounted on an SVD rifle

The PSO-1 (Прицел снайперский оптический, Pritsel snaipersky optichesky, "Optical Sniper Sight") is a 4×24 telescopic sight manufactured in Russia by the Novosibirsk instrument-making factory (NPZ Optics State Plant) and issued with the Russian military Dragunov sniper rifle. It was introduced on 3 July 1963 together with the Dragunov sniper rifle.

== Design ==
The PSO-1 was specifically designed for the SVD as a telescopic sight for military designated marksman activities. The current version of the sight is the PSO-1M2. This telescopic sight is different from the original PSO-1 only in that it lacks the now obsolete infrared detector, which was used to detect generation-zero active-infrared night vision devices like the US M2 Sniperscope. The metal body of the PSO-1 is made from a magnesium alloy. The PSO-1 features a battery-powered red illuminated reticle with light provided by a simple diode bulb. It features professionally ground, fully multi-coated optical elements, a baked enamel finish for scratch protection, and an attached, quick-deployable, extendable sunshade.

The scope body is sealed and filled with nitrogen, which prevents fogging of optics and was designed to function within a -50 °C to 50 °C temperature range. For zeroing the telescopic sight the reticle can be adjusted by manipulating the elevation and windage turrets in 5 centimetres (2.0 in) at 100 metres (109 yd) (0.5 mil or 1.72 MOA) increments.

Considered the higher end of Soviet military side-mount telescopic sights, the quality of the PSO-1 is higher than most other PSO-style telescopic sights. The PSO-1 has neither a focus adjustment nor a parallax compensation control. Most modern military tactical scopes with lower power fixed magnification such as the ACOG, C79 optical sight or SUSAT (intended for rapid close-intermediate range shots rather than long-range sniping) lack such features as well. Modern fixed magnification military high-end-grade sniper telescopic sights scopes intended for long-range shooting usually offer one or both of these features. The positioning of the scope's body to the left of the bore's center line may not be comfortable to all shooters.

=== Bullet drop compensation elevation turret ===
The PSO-1 elevation turret features bullet drop compensation (BDC) in 50 metres (55 yd) or 100 metres (109 yd) increments for engaging point and area targets at ranges from 100 metres (109 yd) up to 1,000 metres (1,094 yd). At longer distances the shooter must use the chevrons that would shift the trajectory by 100 metres (109 yd) per each chevron. The BDC feature must be tuned at the factory for the particular ballistic trajectory of a particular combination of rifle and cartridge at a predefined air density. Inevitable BDC-induced errors will occur if the environmental and meteorological circumstances deviate from the circumstances the BDC was calibrated for. Marksmen can be trained to compensate for these errors.

Besides the BDC elevation (vertical adjustment control) of the reticle, the windage (horizontal adjustment control) of the reticle can also be easily dialed in by the user without having to remove turret caps.

=== Reticle ===
The PSO-1 pattern range-finding reticle. The bottom-left corner can be used to determine the distance from a 1.7 m tall target

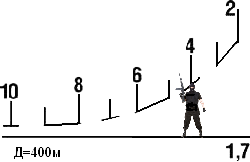
A 1.7 m tall person correctly ranged at 400 metres (437 yd)

The PSO-1 features a reticle with "floating" elements designed for use in range estimation and bullet drop and drift compensation (see external ballistics).

The top center "chevron" (^) is used as the main aiming mark. The horizontal hash marks are for windage and lead corrections and can be used for ranging purposes as well.

To the left is a stadiametric rangefinder that can be used to determine the distance from a 1.7 meters (5 ft 6.9 in) tall object/person from 200 metres (219 yd) (2) to 1,000 metres (1,094 yd) (10). For this the lowest part of the target is lined up on the bottom horizontal line. Where the top of the target touches the top curved line the distance can be determined. This reticle layout is also used in several other telescopic sights produced and used by other former Warsaw Pact member states.

The three lower chevrons in the center are used as hold over points for engaging area targets beyond 1,000 metres (1,094 yd) (the maximum BDC range setting on the elevation drum). The user has to set the elevation turret to 1,000 metres (1,094 yd) and then apply the chevrons for 1,100 metres (1,203 yd), 1,200 metres (1,312 yd) or 1,300 metres (1,422 yd) respectively.

The 10 reticle hashmarks in the horizontal plane can be used to compensate for wind or moving targets and can also be used for additional stadiametric rangefinding purposes, since they are spaced at 1 milliradian intervals, meaning if an object is 5 m wide it will appear 10 hashmarks wide at 500 m.

The reticle can be illuminated by a small battery-powered lamp.

== Mounting system ==
The telescopic sight proprietary mount is adjustable for tension on the SVD rifle's side rail scope mount. This side rail is a type of dovetail rail known as the Warsaw Pact rail, which has cut-out portions to reduce weight and allow easier installation. The side rail mount is an offset mounting that positions the PSO-1 telescopic sight axis to the left side in relation to the receiver center axis. The mount has a castle nut that screws into the bottom of the locking lever. The spring-loaded portion of the clamp has to be pressed down to tighten or loosen the castle nut as needed.

The telescopic sight is factory matched to the rifle by engraving the scope's serial number on to the butt stock of the SVD rifle. Commercial Russian Tigr rifles (based on the SVD military rifle) have the serial number of the rifle engraved in to the PSO-1M2 scope's side mount.

== Accessories ==
The PSO-1 is issued with a lens hood that can be attached to the ocular to reduce/eliminate image quality impairing stray light and a carrying case to protect the sight during transport and storage.

== Specifications ==
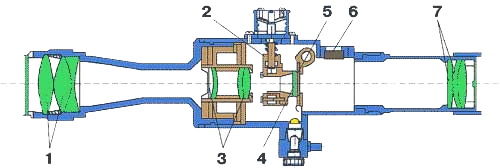
Original PSO-1 internals; 1 = ocular optical elements, 2 = horizontal and vertical adjustment system, 3 = optical erector elements, 4 = etched reticle optical element, 5 = infrared detector screen, 6 = light filter, 7 = objective optical elements

- Magnification: 4×
- Objective diameter: 24 mm
- Field of view: 6°
- Exit pupil: 6 mm
- Eye relief: 80 mm
- Limiting optical resolution: 12 SOA
- Power supply for reticle illumination: 1 AA battery
- Weight: 0.6 kg
- Overall dimensions: (L x W x H): 375 x 70 x 132 mm

== Variants ==
The PSO-1M2-1 Used on the VSS Vintorez and AS VAL features a unique reticle, and elevation turret calibrated for the 9×39mm cartridge. The reticle features a stadiametric rangefinder, ranging out to 400 meters and a single chevron as an aiming point with vertical stadia lines for a windage hold.

The PSO-1M2-1 has also been made in a version for the 7.62×39mm intermediate cartridge, which has the range drum marked for up to 1,000 meters. This version has a 400 m stadia metric range finder marked 1.7 m.

The POSP is a commercial variant which features various reticles, windage/elevation turrets, mounts, magnification, and variations of the body and lenses used. Various Russian and Belarusian factories manufacture these optics under the same name.

== See also ==
- Reticle
- Dragunov sniper rifle
- Dragunov SVU
