= AS Val and VSS Vintorez =

Soviet specialised assault rifle and sniper rifle

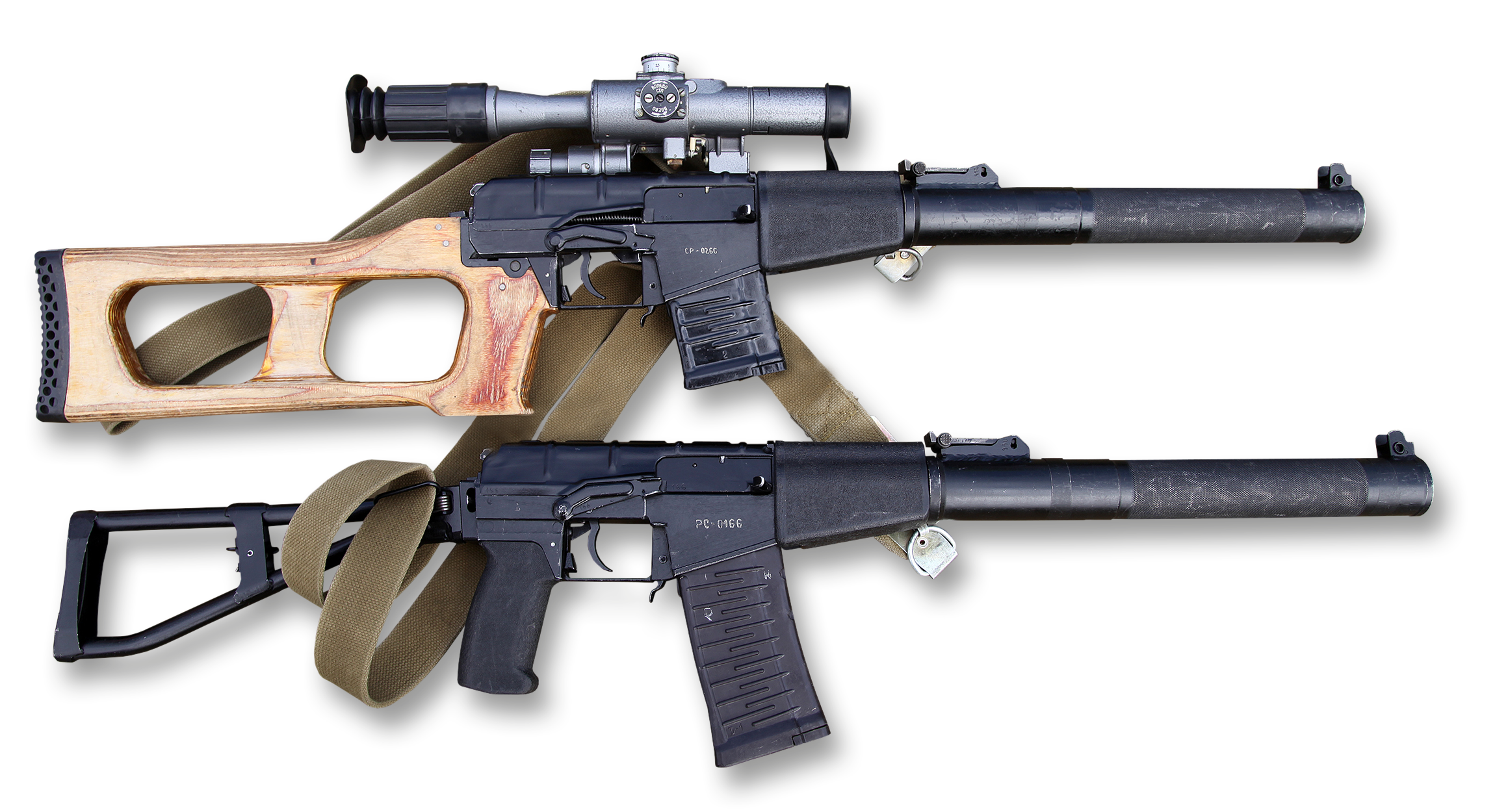
- VSS Vintorez (top) with the PSO-1-1 and 10-round magazine. AS Val (bottom) with a 20-round magazine
- Type: Assault rifle (AS Val); Designated marksman rifle / Sniper rifle (VSS Vintorez)
- Place of origin: Soviet Union

Service history
- In service: 1987−present
- Used by: See users
- Wars: First Chechen War; Second Chechen War; Iraq War; Russo-Georgian War; Russo-Ukrainian War

Production history
- Designer: Pyotr Serdyukov and Vladimir Krasnikov
- Designed: 1983 (VSS Vintorez); 1985 (AS Val)
- Manufacturer: Tula Arms Plant
- Produced: 1987−present
- Variants: See Variants

Specifications
- Mass: 2.5 kg (5.5 lb) (AS Val, unloaded); 5.7 kg (13 lb) (AS Val, with NSP-3 night sight); 2.6 kg (5.7 lb) (VSS Vintorez, unloaded); 3.4 kg (7.5 lb) (VSS Vintorez, with PSO-1-1 telescopic sight)
- Length: 650 mm (26 in) (AS Val, stock folded); 875 mm (34.4 in) (AS Val, stock extended); 894 mm (35.2 in) (VSS Vintorez)
- Barrel length: 200 mm (7.9 in)
- Cartridge: 9×39mm
- Action: Gas-operated long-stroke, rotating bolt
- Rate of fire: 800−900 rounds/min
- Muzzle velocity: 280–310 m/s (920–1,020 ft/s)
- Effective firing range: 400 m (440 yd) (day); 300 m (330 yd) (night)
- Feed system: 10-, 20-, 30-round detachable box magazines
- Sights: Iron sights, telescopic sight, night sight

The AS Val (Russian: АС «Вал»; Автома́т Специа́льный, romanized: Avtomát Spetsiálny "Val", lit. 'Special Automatic–Shaft'), GRAU designation: 6P30, is an assault rifle variant that features a folding stock and was developed in 1985.

The VSS Vintorez (Russian: ВСС «Винторе́з»; Винто́вка Сна́йперская Специа́льная, romanized: Vintóvka Snáyperskaya Spetsiálnaya "Vintorez", lit. 'Special Sniper Rifle–Thread Cutter'), GRAU designation: 6P29, is a Soviet-designed specialised sniper rifle/designated marksman rifle chambered in the 9×39mm subsonic cartridge that features an integral suppressor and is capable of fully automatic fire. Its initial development began in 1983, and was shortly followed by the development of the AS Val.

The VSS Vintorez and AS Val were developed by TsNIITochMash to replace modified general-purpose firearms, such as the AKS-74UB, BS-1, APB, and PB, for clandestine operations, much like the PSS Vul. Manufacturing began at the Tula Arms Plant after its adoption by the Armed Forces of the Soviet Union in 1987.

== Development ==
The VSS Vintorez was based on the RG-036 prototype that was designed in 1981 by TsNIITochMash. Further development of the VSS Vintorez was carried out in parallel with the AS Val, to provide a suppressed sniper rifle for Spetsnaz undercover or clandestine units and capable of defeating NATO body armour at ranges up to 400 m (440 yd) with as little noise as possible.

The AS Val can trace its origins back to the 1960 U-2 incident, where the Soviets captured a US Air Force pilot (Gary Powers) alongside his equipment, including a suppressed pistol, which impressed them enough to issue a requirement for a similar Soviet weapon. The captured pistol was examined by the TsNIITochMash at Klimovsk by a team of designers that included G. Petropavlov, Yu Krulov, V. Sabelinikov, A. Neougodev, A. Deryagin, A. Khinikadze, I. Kas'yanov, P. Serdyukov, V. Petrov, and V. Levchenko. They pioneered the development of suppressed weapons and specialized ammunition in Russia.

With increasing tensions between the West and the Soviet Union during the late 1970s and 1980s, and both the United States and the USSR locked in a war between proxies, the KGB and GRU ordered the development of small arms suitable for covert operations around the world and in 1981, weapon designers P. I. Serdyukov and V. F. Krasnikov of TsNIITochMash began working on a combination of a new suppressed rifle and subsonic cartridge.

== Operational history ==
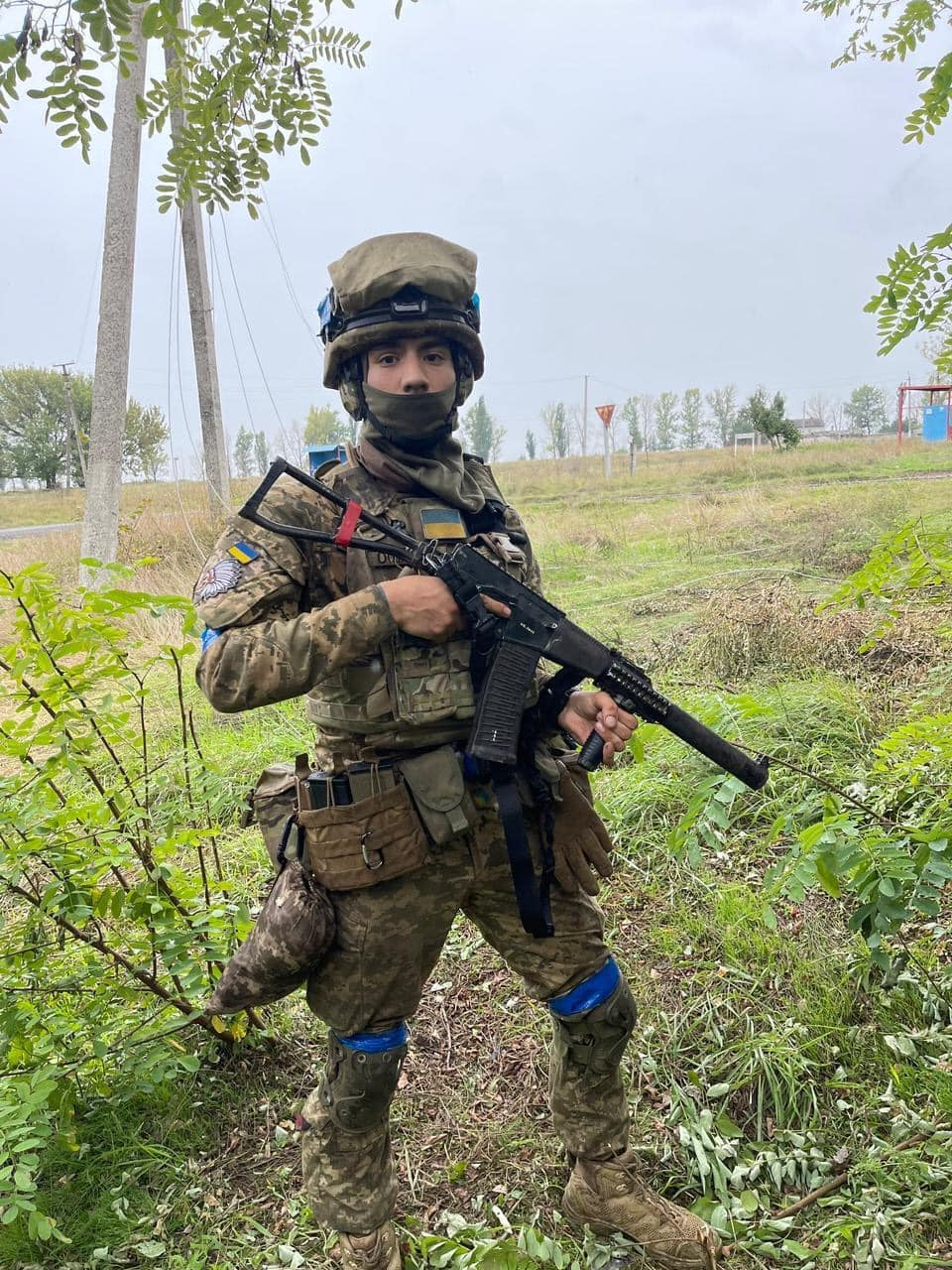
International Legion of Ukraine soldier showing a captured Russian ASM

The VSS Vintorez and AS Val were both issued to Soviet troops since the late 1980s. Both rifles were used during the First Chechen War in 1994 and the Second Chechen War in 1999, though they remained relatively obscure amongst Western intelligence agencies and similar organisations until the Russians deployed troops to South Ossetia during the Russo-Georgian War in 2008. During the conflict, both Russian and Georgian forces used the VSS Vintorez. Both the VSS Vintorez and AS Val were also seen in use by Russian Spetsnaz during the Russo-Ukrainian War.

The VSS Vintorez was used in small numbers by the Security Service of Ukraine's Alpha Group, which was protecting the Ukrainian embassy in Iraq in the 2000s. By 2014, it was no longer in use by any security forces in Ukraine. According to Militarnyi, the VSS Vintorez was retired from service due to the lack of ammo. However, during the Russian invasion of Ukraine, significant numbers of VSS Vintorez and AS Val were captured from Russian forces.

== Design details ==
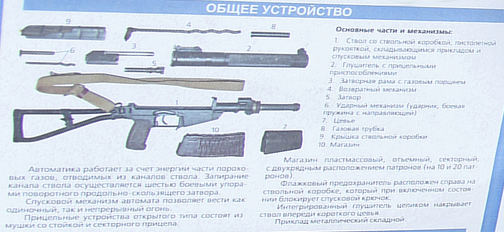
An instruction sheet with a field stripped model of the AS Val

The VSS Vintorez and AS Val uses a modified Kalashnikov action, a gas-operated rotating bolt combined with an integral suppressor and chambered for the 9×39mm subsonic cartridge. The barrel of the VSS Vintorez is optimised for accurate sniper fire paired with the SP-5 (7N8) cartridge firing a heavy 250 grain FMJ bullet at subsonic speed, whilst the barrel of the AS Val is optimised for sustained automatic fire paired with the SP-6 (7N9) cartridge that features a hardened steel or tungsten tip to defeat body armour.

Both the VSS Vintorez and AS Val feature a selective fire mechanism and use the same detachable box magazine design. The AS Val is primarily used with 20-round magazines and the VSS Vintorez is normally used in semi-automatic mode with 10-round magazines, whilst fully automatic mode is used for emergency situations, ambushes or attacks against soft-skinned vehicles such as trucks. Both rifles are also compatible with the 30-round SR-3M magazines. The magazines have a series of horizontal indentations to provide tactile identification and prevent confusion with Kalashnikov-pattern magazines. The indentations also provide rigidity to the magazine walls.

The safety selector for the VSS Vintorez and AS Val is similar to Kalashnikov rifles. However, the fire selector that switches the firing mode is located behind the trigger.

=== Sights ===
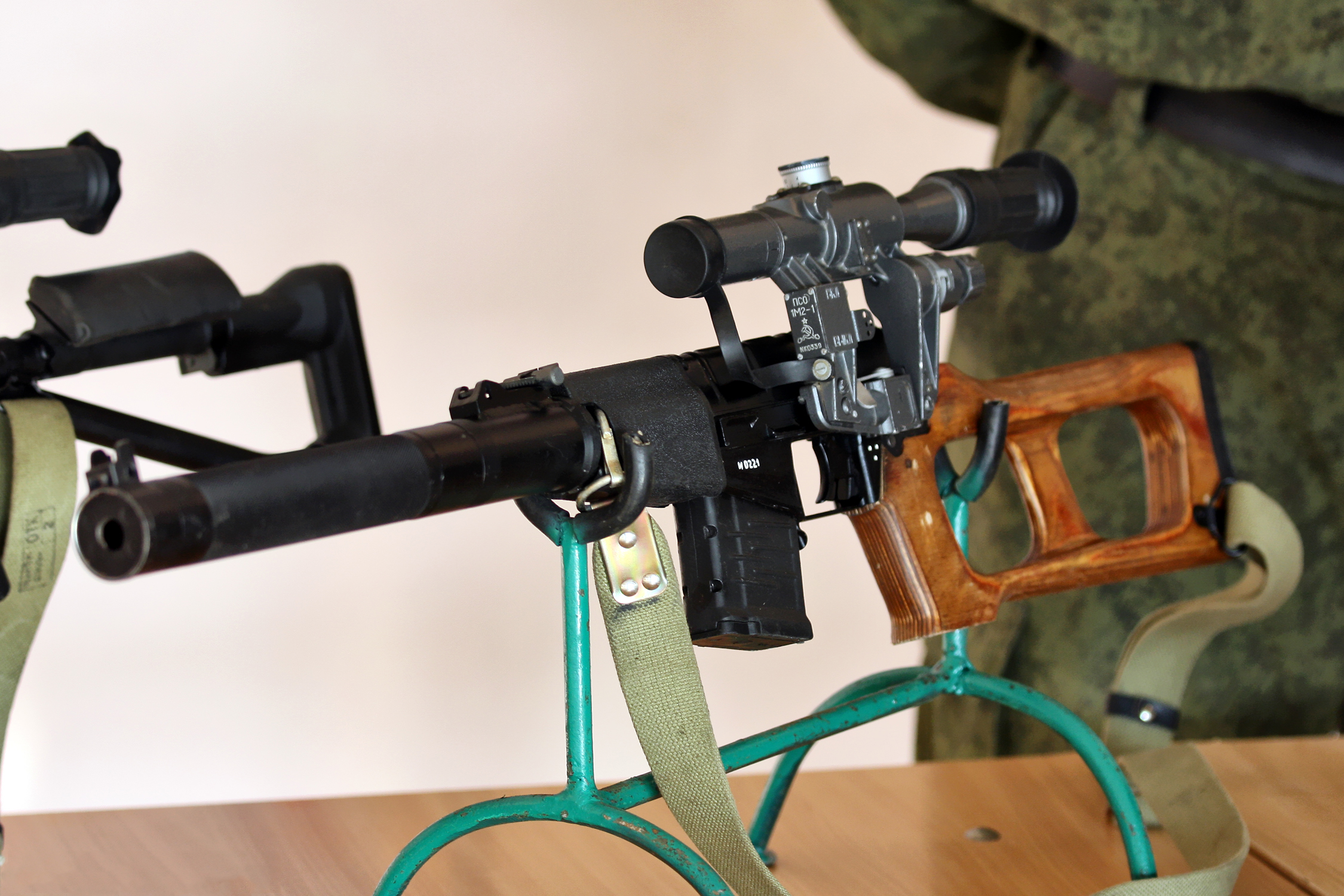
VSS Vintorez mounted with a PSO-1M2-1 telescopic sight

The VSS Vintorez and AS Val can be broken down for transport in a special aluminium briefcase for clandestine operations. A PSO-1-1 (1P43) telescopic sight, a NPSU-3 night sight with a 3.46× magnification, and two magazines are included in the briefcase. According to Janes, the PSO-1-1 has a length of 375 mm (14.8 in) and weights 580 g (20 oz), while the night sight has a length of 340 mm (13 in) and weights 2.1 kg (4.6 lb). The VSS Vintorez and AS Val can also mount the PSO-1 telescopic sight of the SVD rifle, or the 1PN52-1 night sight. Both rifles also feature a built-in iron sights integrated with the suppressor.

=== Integral suppressor ===
The integral suppressor makes use of the dual-chamber principle: the propellant gases are vented through specially designed perforations along the barrel into the first chamber, where the hot gases cool down and lose pressure before passing through the second chamber via a series of mesh screens which break the gas stream even further before leaving the barrel. The resulting sound signature is significantly lower than an unsuppressed rifle, and even from a short distance it cannot be recognised as the discharge of a rifle.

== Variants ==
=== ASM and VSSM ===
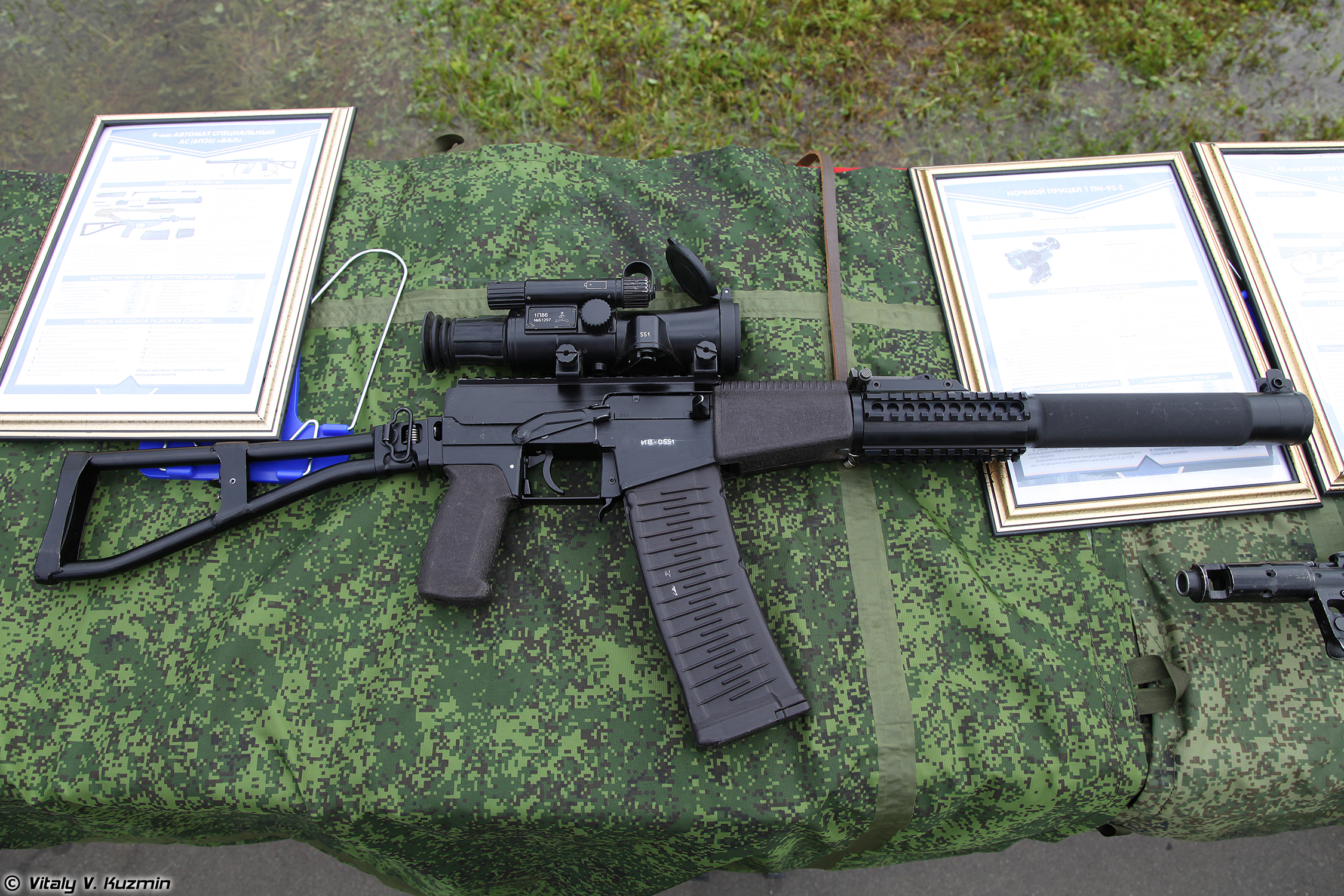
ASM with a 30-round magazine

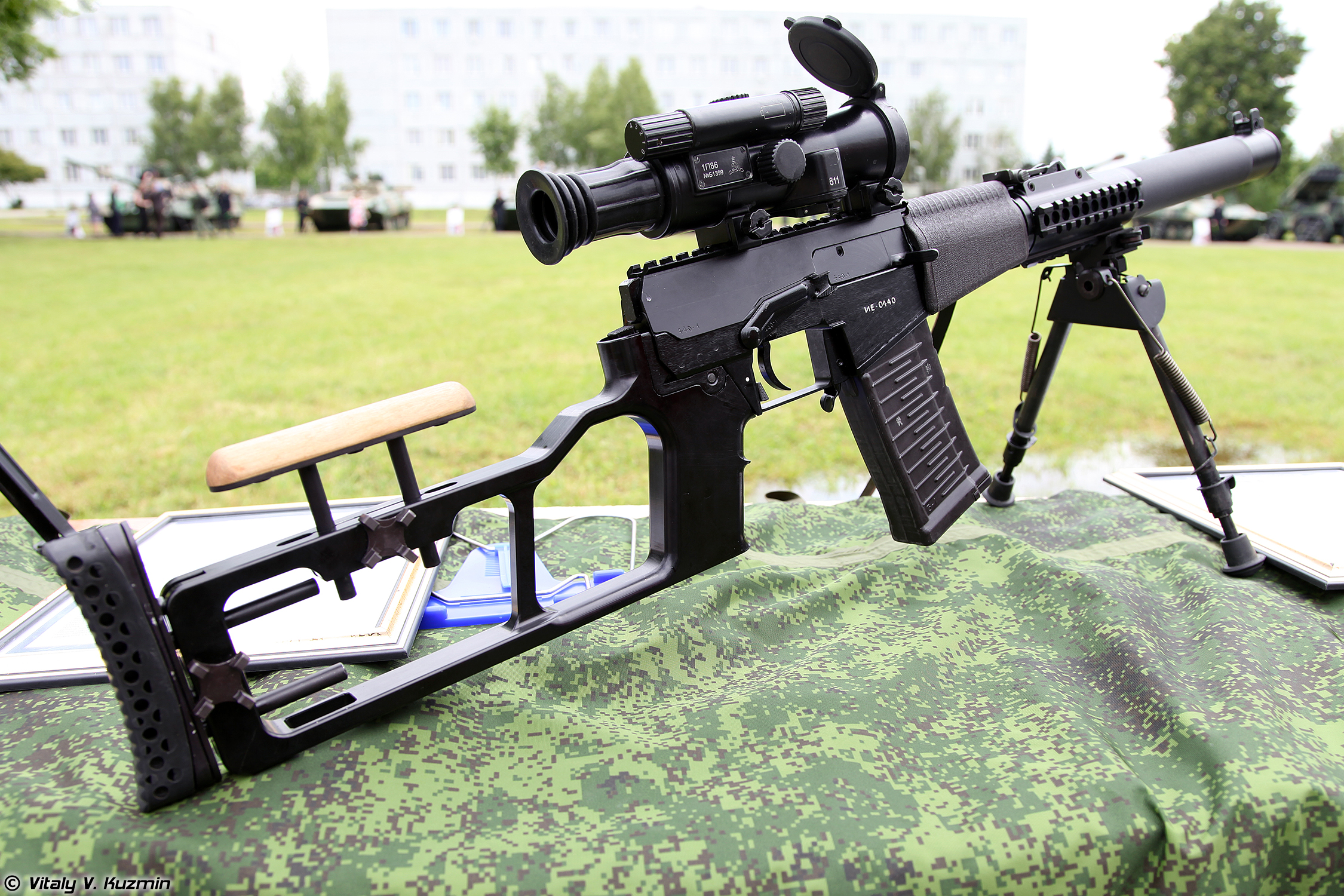
VSSM with a 20-round magazine

The ASM (6P30M) and VSSM (6P29M) are modernised variants of the AS Val and VSS Vintorez, respectively. Both feature a redesigned dust cover with a Picatinny rail on top, as well as a removable Picatinny rail mount that shrouds the suppressor. The VSSM is fitted with a redesigned aluminium buttstock with an adjustable cheek rest and butt pad. New accessories, such as the 30‑round magazine and the 1P86 optical sight that features variable magnification of either 1× or 4×, come as standard. Deliveries began in 2018.

=== KO VSS ===
The KO VSS (Russian: КО ВСС) is a civilian‑legal, semi‑automatic only variant of the VSS Vintorez that features a Picatinny rail on the top cover of the receiver, similar to the VSSM. A variant that features a dovetail mount is designated as the KO VSS-01 (Russian: КО ВСС-01).

== Gallery ==
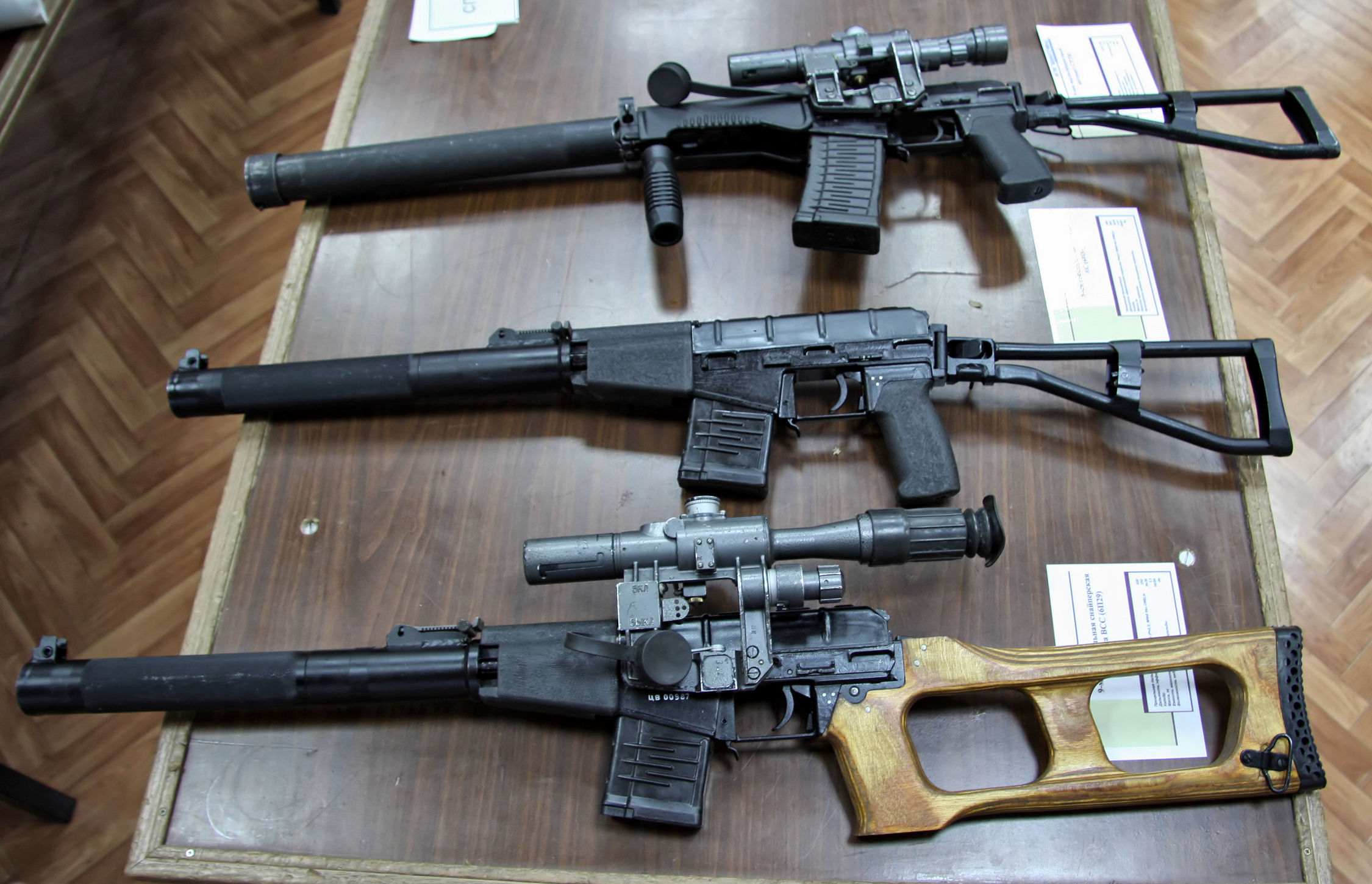
SR3M (top), AS Val (middle), and VSS Vintorez (bottom)

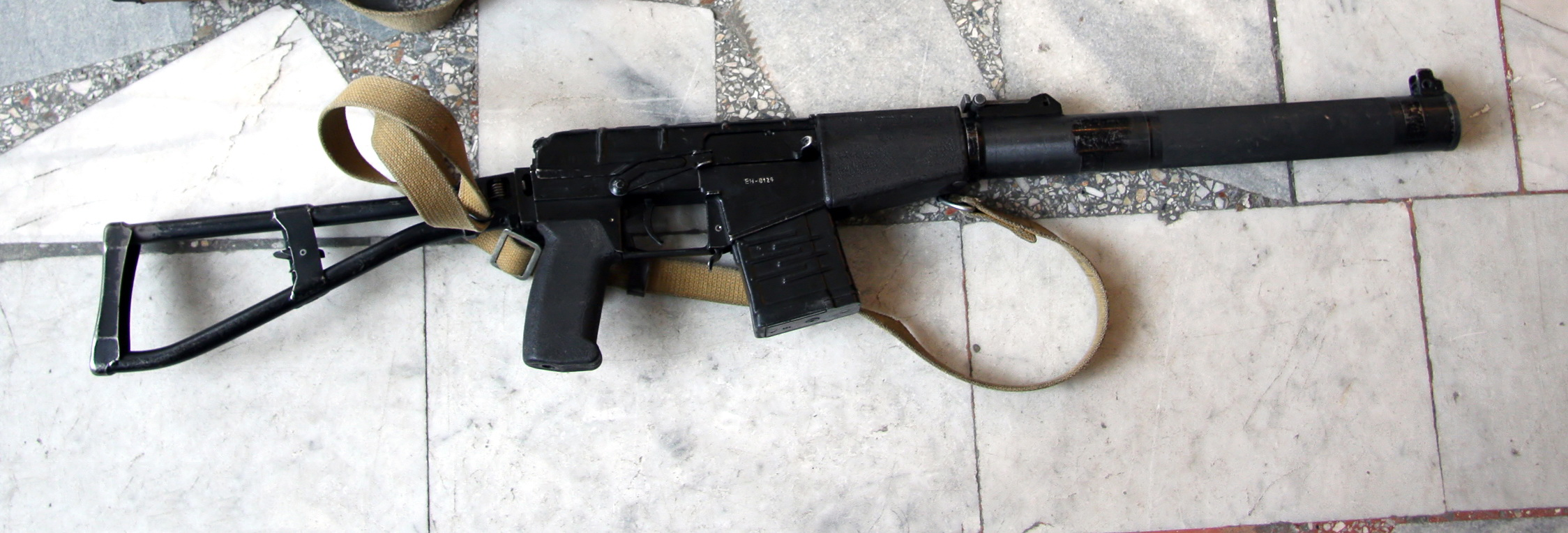
AS Val with a 10-round magazine

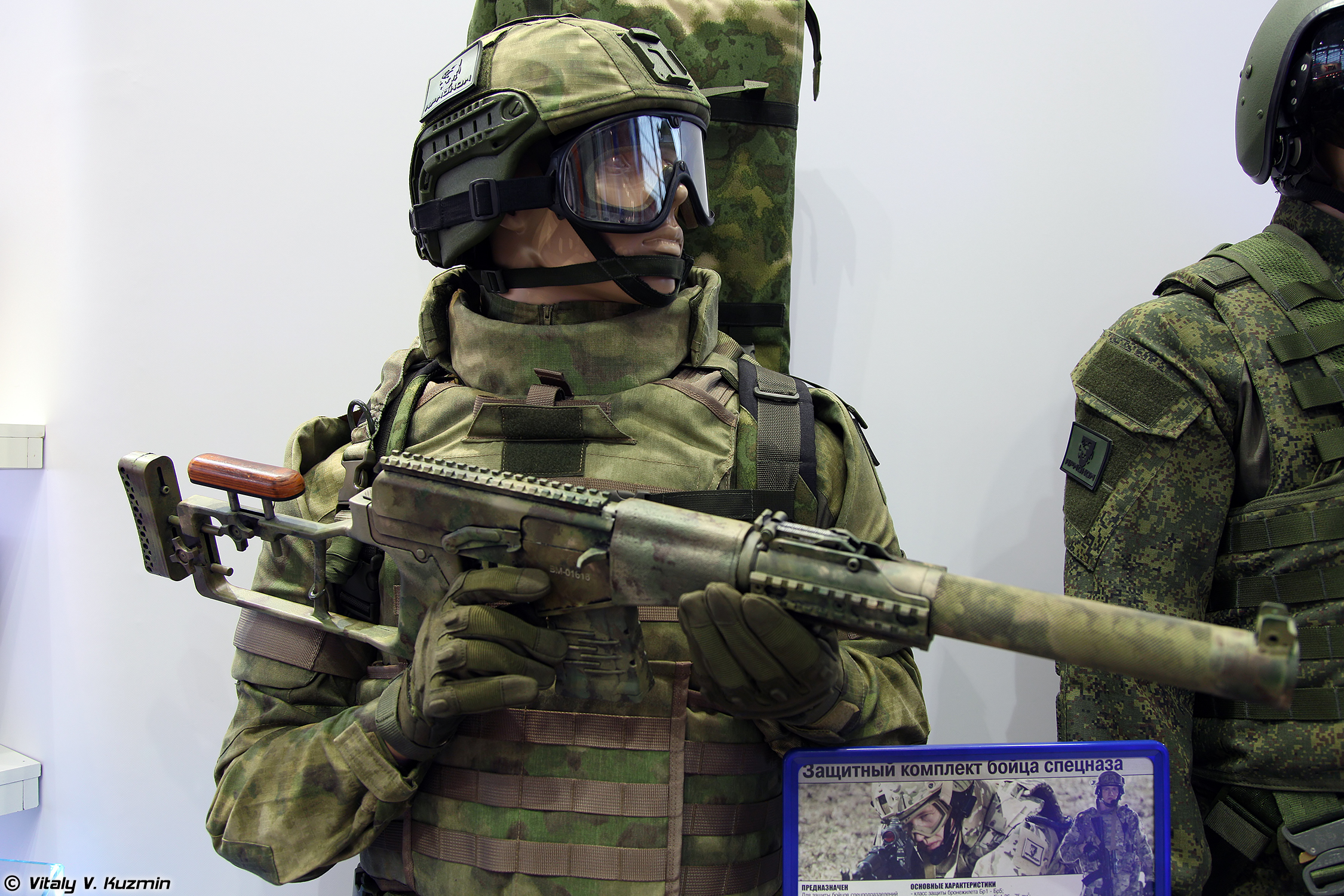
VSSM on display

== Users ==
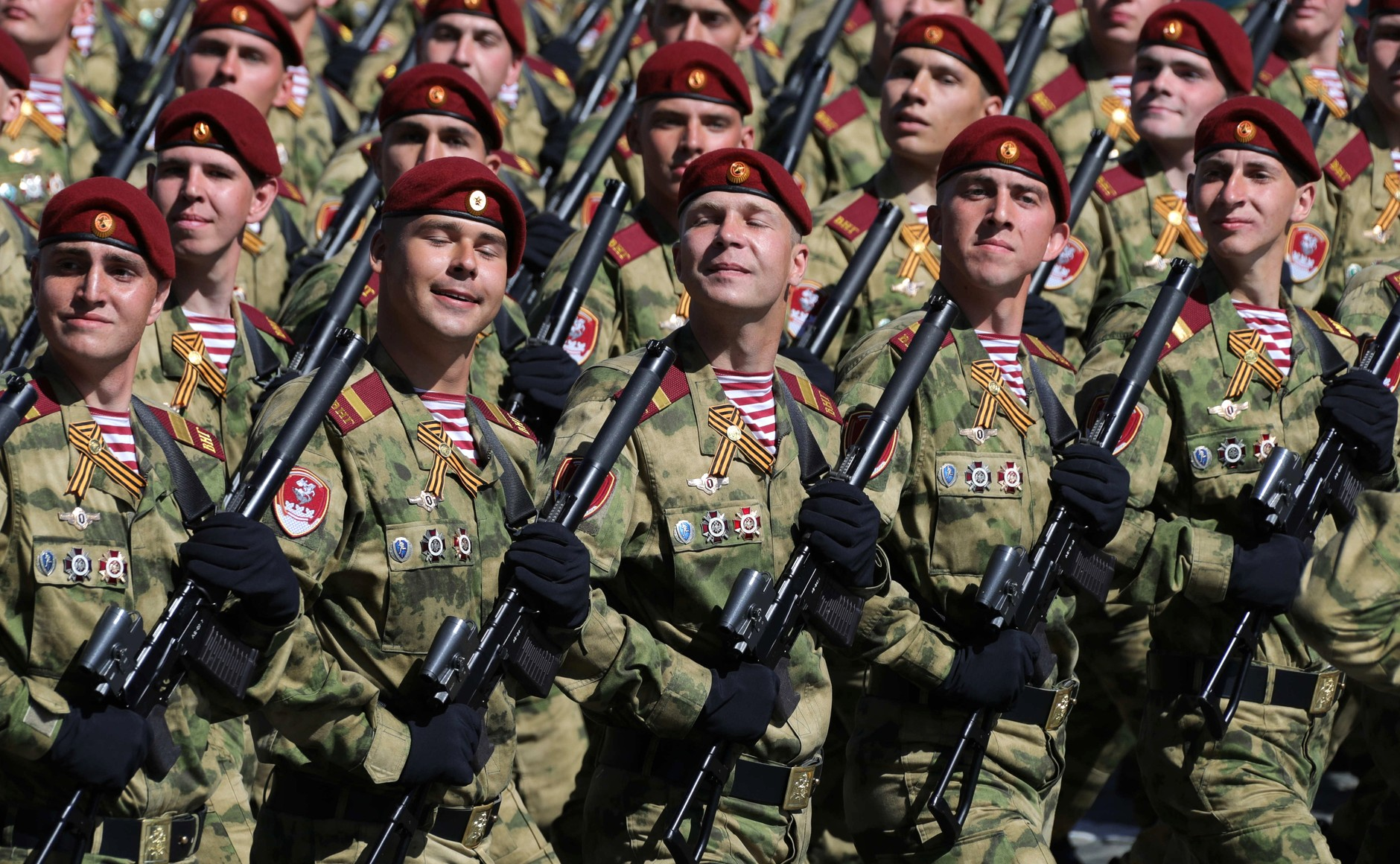
National Guard of Russia troops carrying the AS Val in the 2018 Moscow Victory Day Parade

- Armenia: VSS Vintorez were delivered to the Armenian Army by Russia amongst other weaponry.
- Azerbaijan
- Belarus: VSS Vintorez used by various special forces.
- Cuba: VSS Vintorez and AS Val are used by the Mobile Brigade of Special Troops.
- Georgia: VSS Vintorez and AS Val are used by the Georgian Army and police special forces, some configured with Aimpoint and Kobra red dot sights.
- India: VSS Vintorez used by MARCOS.
- Russia: VSS Vintorez and AS Val are used by Spetsnaz units, Federal Security Service (FSB) and OMON.
- Ukraine: VSS Vintorez and AS Val are used by the Ukrainian special forces.

=== Former users ===
- Chechen Republic of Ichkeria
- Soviet Union

== See also ==
- OTs-14 Groza
