= Didgori =

Didgori generally refers to:

- Battle of Didgori, a conflict between the Kingdom of Georgia and a Muslim coalition at Didgori near Tbilisi in August 1121
- Mount Didgori, Mount Didgori, mountain situated west of Tbilisi

Didgori may also refer to:

- Didgori series of Georgian armoured personnel carriers:
  - Didgori-1
  - Didgori-2
  - Didgori-3
  - Didgori Medevac
