= Didgori-3 =

Georgian 6×6 MRAP armored personnel carrier

Didgori 3
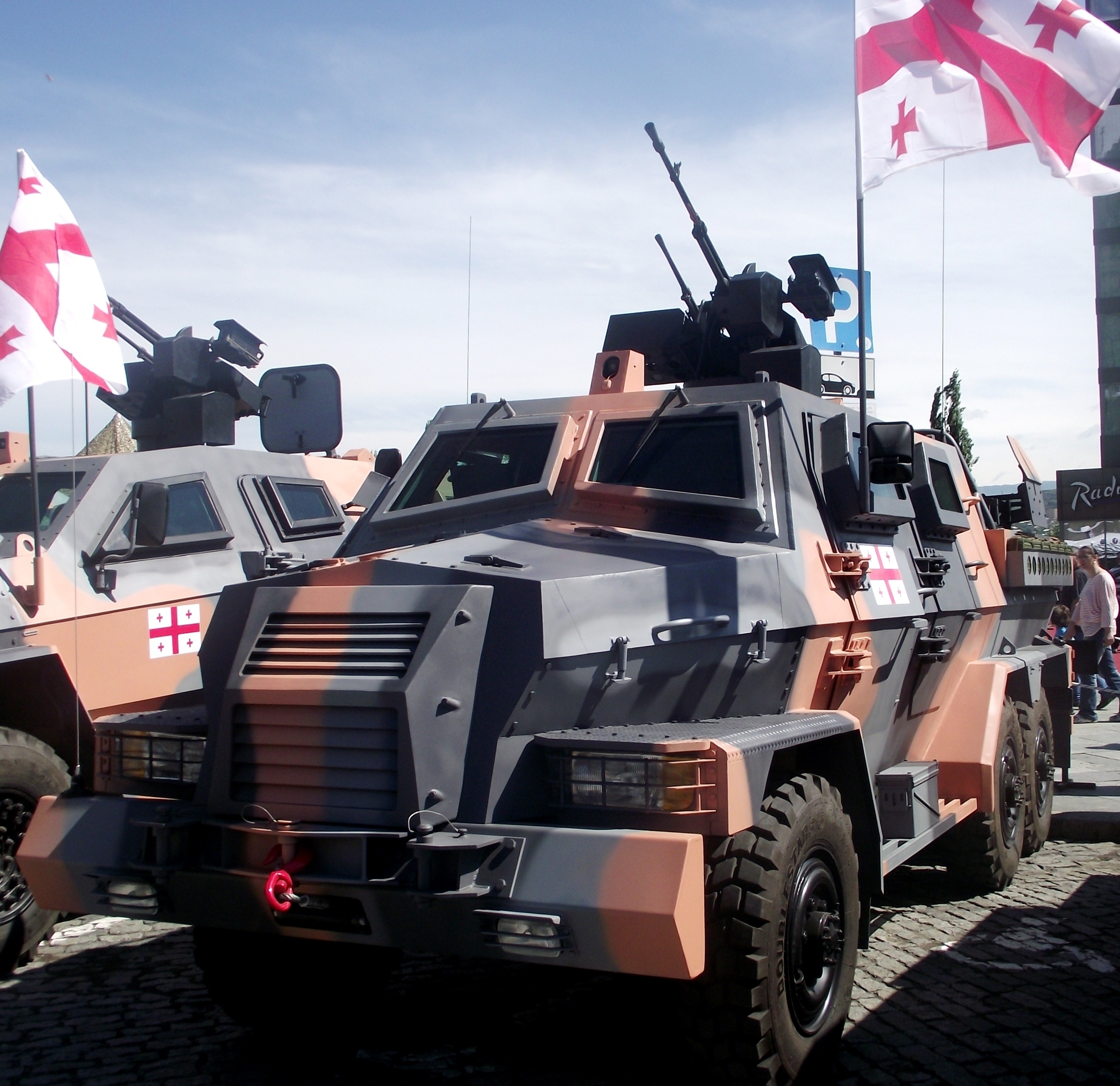
- Type: Armoured personnel carrier
- Place of origin: Georgia

Service history
- In service: 2012 - Present
- Used by: Georgian Land Forces

Production history
- Designer: Scientific Technical Center Delta
- Manufacturer: Tbilisi Aircraft Manufacturing (Armory Plant)

Specifications
- Mass: 9000 kg (combat weight 10 tonnes)
- Length: 6,5 m
- Width: 2,11 m
- Height: 2,26 m
- Crew: 1+8
- Armor: protection according to STANAG level 3. Can be further reinforced with uparmored version
- Main armament: RC 12.7×108mm NSV machine gun
- Secondary armament: Two 7.62mm PK machine gun
- Engine: Double turbo diesel engine 250hp (military)
- Suspension: wheeled 6×6
- Operational range: 500 km
- Maximum speed: 100 km/h

Didgori-3 (Georgian: დიდგორი-3) is a Georgian 6×6 MRAP type armored personnel carrier developed by the State Scientific Technical Center "Delta". The Didgori-3 was first displayed during a military parade in 2012 and was proposed as patrol vehicle for deployments.

== Technical characteristics ==
Didgori-3, like two previous Didgori Armoured Personnel Carrier and Didgori-2 is equipped with night/thermal imaging cameras and GPS navigation system. Information from the cameras are provided on three independent displays: one for the driver, one for the commander and one for the Passengers.

This armored vehicle is based on a modified chassis of KrAZ-6322 truck chassis and is powered by a YaMZ-238D 300 hp turbocharged diesel engine. The Didgori-3 is fitted with a self-recovery winch and can tow trailers or artillery pieces.

== Armor ==
The armour withstands impacts of 7.62×54mmR AP rounds, mine blasts from underneath in accordance to STANAG level 2 and direct grenade hits. Further details are unknown, since the composition of the material is classified. The monocoque steel v-hull provides protection against small arms fire, artillery shell shrapnel, anti-personnel/tank mines and IEDs.

Front wheel arches are designed to be blown away to free blast pockets. The design is meant to follow the basic principle of US MRAP vehicles for peacekeeping missions.

== Users ==
- Georgia – 33+ in service Georgian Armed Forces. More on order.

== See also ==
- Didgori-2 – (Georgia)
- Otokar Cobra – (Turkey)
- HMMWV – (United States)
- Oshkosh L-ATV – (United States)
- Lazika – (Georgia)
