= Tbilisi Aircraft Manufacturing =

Georgian aerospace company

Coordinates: 41°40′9.73″N 44°52′30.57″E

JSC "TAM" Tbilisi Aircraft Manufacturing
- Logo
- Type: State Owned Aerospace Factory
- Industry: Aerospace
- Genre: Manufacturing
- Founded: December 12, 1941
- Founder: Soviet Union
- Headquarters: 191, Monk Gabriel Salosi Ave., 0144, Tbilisi, Georgia
- Key people: Mikheil Kutateladze, General Director
- Products: Military and Dual-Use Products
- Website: http://www.tam.ge/

Tbilisi Aircraft Manufacturing (TAM), also known as JSC Tbilaviamsheni (formerly known as 31st Aviation Factory), is a Georgian aerospace development and manufacturing company, which also partially manufactures APCs and IFVs.

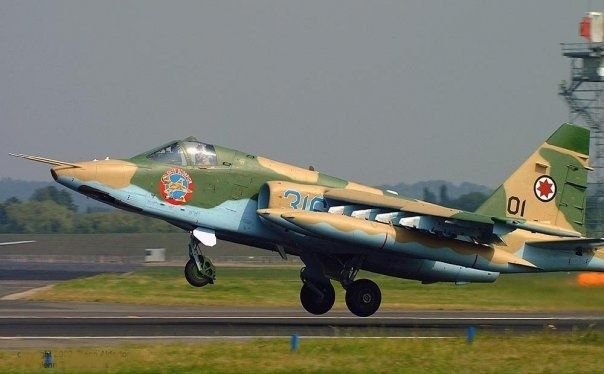
Su-25KM Scorpion

== History ==
Tbilisi Aircraft Manufacturing (former Tbilisi Aircraft State Association) was established on December 15, 1941. In the early days of World War II the aircraft factories of Taganrog and Sevastopol were moved to Tbilisi, Georgia. Soon after the move, Tbilisi Aircraft State Association (TAM) launched the production of its first fighter aircraft, the LaGG-3. Through the war TAM manufactured additional fighter aircraft for the Soviet Air Force including the LaGG-3 and Yak-3. During World War II, the company was the sole supplier of fighter aircraft to the Caucasian front.

Following World War II, TAM worked in conjunction with the Yakovlev Design Bureaus to build the first Soviet jet fighter, the Yak-15 in 1946, followed by the Yak-17, Yak-23 and Yak-23 twin-seat trainer jet.

In the 1950s, the factory started the production of the Mikoyan-Gurevich MiG-17 fighter aircraft, and later, the MiG-17. Starting in 1957, TAM built the MiG-21 two-seater fighter aircraft and its various derivative aircraft. TAM continued MiG-21 production for about 25 years. At the same time the company manufactured the K-10S air-to-surface guided missile. The company also began to diversify into civil engineering projects, producing cable car cabins and equipment between 1950 and 1990. Still-functioning Tbilisi Aviation Factory cable cars include those in Crimea, Kislovodsk, Pyatigorsk, Sochi, Sigulda, Khulo, Chiatura, Borjomi, and Kutaisi.

The first Sukhoi Su-25 (known in the West as the "Frogfoot") close support aircraft took its maiden voyage from the runway of 31st aviation factory. Since then, more than 800 Su-25s have been delivered to customers worldwide. From the first Su-25 to the 1990s, JSC Tbilaviamsheni was the only manufacturer of this type of aircraft. Along with the Su-25 aircraft, 31st aviation factory also launched large-scale production of air-to-air R-60 and R-73 IR guided missiles, a production effort that built over 6,000 missiles a year and that lasted until the early 1990s.

In the late 1990s, there was a joint project of Tbilaviamsheni and the Georgian Space Constructions Institute to design and produce the space antenna-reflector, which were successfully used in their first attempt on the Russian space station "MIR".

From 1996 to 1998 the factory produced Su-25U.

In 2001, the factory started upgrading basic Su-25 airframes to the Su-25KM Scorpion variant.

During the South Ossetia war of August 2008, the Russian Air Force bombed the TAM factory.

After the 2008 Russo-Georgian war, it became apparent that Georgia could not rely on outdated Soviet APCs. Hence, the factory started development and construction of the Didgori Armoured Personnel Carrier series and Lazika Infantry Fighting Vehicle in cooperation with STC Delta.

In 2020, the factory started restoration of Georgian Air Force aircraft.

== Current capabilities ==
TAM currently is capable of repair, overhaul, life-extension of the following aircraft and missiles:

- Sukhoi Su-25
- Mil Mi-8, Mi-17
- Mil Mi-24, Mi-35
- R-60 (missile)
- R-73 (missile)
- Aero L-39 Albatros

== Customers ==
- Georgia
- Azerbaijan – Bought several Su-25 planes.
- Gambia - Bought one Su-25 plane.
- Turkmenistan - Received several Su-25 planes as a part of a gas deal.

== Directors ==
- 1941-1942 — Suren Ivanovich Agadzhanov
- 1942-1950 — Vladimir Yeremeyevich Saladze
- 1950-1978 — Yakov Romanovich Khvedeliani
- 1978-1990 — Pantiko Shalvovich Tordia
- 1990-1998 — Avtandil Grigorievich Khoperia
- 1998-2002 — Pantiko Shalvovich Tordia
- 2002-2020 — Nodar Beridze
- 2020-2021 — Zurab Azarashvili
- 2021-2025 — Mikheil Oglishvili
- From 2026 — Mikheil Kutateladze
