= SWAN III =

Estonian unmanned aerial vehicle

General information
- Type: Unmanned aerial vehicle
- National origin: Estonia
- Designer: ELI Military Simulations
- Status: Active
- Primary user: Georgian Land Forces
- Number built: Handful

History
- Introduction date: 2012
- First flight: 2011
- Developed from: 2012

The SWAN III is a type of unmanned aerial vehicle designed by ELI Military Simulations of Estonia in cooperation with STC Delta. The system is intended for use in border policing, aerial reconnaissance, signals intelligence, disaster monitoring and other roles.

== Technical details ==
The aircraft is powered by a built-in combustion engine. It lands on a parachute and unfolds airbags for protection. It is controlled remotely from a ground unit.

- Flight time: 8 hours
- Altitude: 100–3000 meters
- Speed: 60–160 km/h
- Payload: Dual camera, photographic camera, thermal camera, infrared camera
