= Multi-function Unmanned Helicopter (Georgia) =

Georgian Unmanned Helicopter "Black Widow"
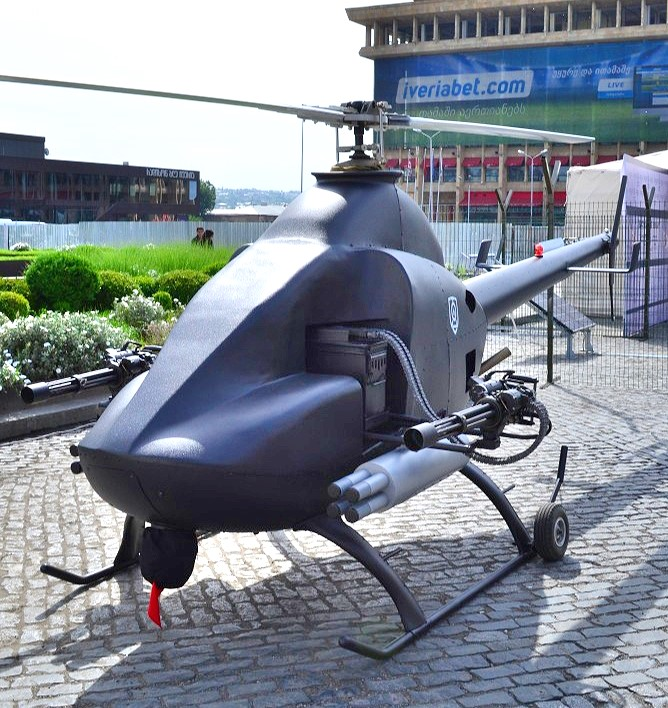
- Multi-functional Unmanned Helicopter on Georgia's Independence Day

General information
- Type: UAV helicopter
- National origin: Georgia
- Manufacturer: Scientific Technical Center Delta
- Designer: Scientific Technical Center Delta
- Status: Unknown

History
- Introduction date: 2015; 11 years ago
- Developed from: Exec 162F

The Multi-function Unmanned Helicopter "Black Widow" is a type of unmanned aerial vehicle developed in Georgia by STC Delta. The system is intended for both military and civil purposes. Its spheres of usage are border policing, weapon aiming, signals intelligence, disaster monitoring and other roles. Armament of the UAV helicopter is 2 × M-134 minigun and 8 × unguided rocket missiles or 2 × M-134 minigun and 2 laser guided AT rockets. The vehicle is based on the Exec 162F. It was presented to the public on the Independence Day of Georgia in 2015.

== Specifications ==
Data from STC Delta

General characteristics

- Crew: 0
- Capacity: 238 kg (525 lb)
- Length: 6.71 m (22 ft 0 in)
- Wingspan: 7.62 m (25 ft 0 in)
- Height: 2.44 m (8 ft 0 in)
- Empty weight: 442 kg (974 lb)
- Max takeoff weight: 680 kg (1,499 lb)
- Powerplant: 1 × RotorWay RI 162F flat-four piston engine, 110 kW (150 hp)

Performance

- Maximum speed: 185 km/h (115 mph, 100 kn)
- Cruise speed: 152 km/h (94 mph, 82 kn)
- Combat range: 150 km (93 mi, 81 nmi)
- Endurance: 2 hours
- Service ceiling: 3,048 m (10,000 ft)
