= Scorpion silent pistol =

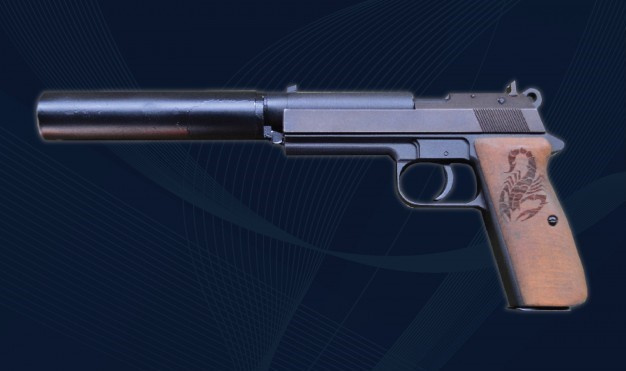
- Type: Silent semi-automatic pistol
- Place of origin: Georgia

Service history
- Used by: Georgia

Production history
- Designed: 2011
- Manufacturer: STC Delta

Specifications
- Mass: 1,200 g (42 oz) (with magazine)
- Length: 195 mm (7.7 in) (without attached suppressor)
- Cartridge: 9x17mm (.380 ACP)
- Action: semi-automatic
- Effective firing range: 25–50 m (27–55 yd)
- Maximum firing range: N/A
- Feed system: 15-round detachable box magazine
- Sights: Fixed, iron sights

The Scorpion (Georgian: მორიელი) silent pistol is a special purpose suppressor integrated weapon which was designed by STC Delta solely for special operation forces. It was introduced in 2012 along with other new side arms.

== Features ==
For the development the best features of similar type weapons were taken into consideration. The primary distinction between the Scorpion and regular semi-automatic pistols is the integrated noise dampening or suppressor system which is further extended by attachable silencers. Unlike similar models it has a large magazine capacity while being slightly longer and heavier. It uses 9 mm Kurz Browning cartridges and fires in semi-automatic mode.

== Use ==
Because of its designated purpose the Scorpion is intended to be used only by military or other services selected units and special forces. It is not for civilian use.

== See also ==
- PB (pistol)
