= Didgori Medevac =

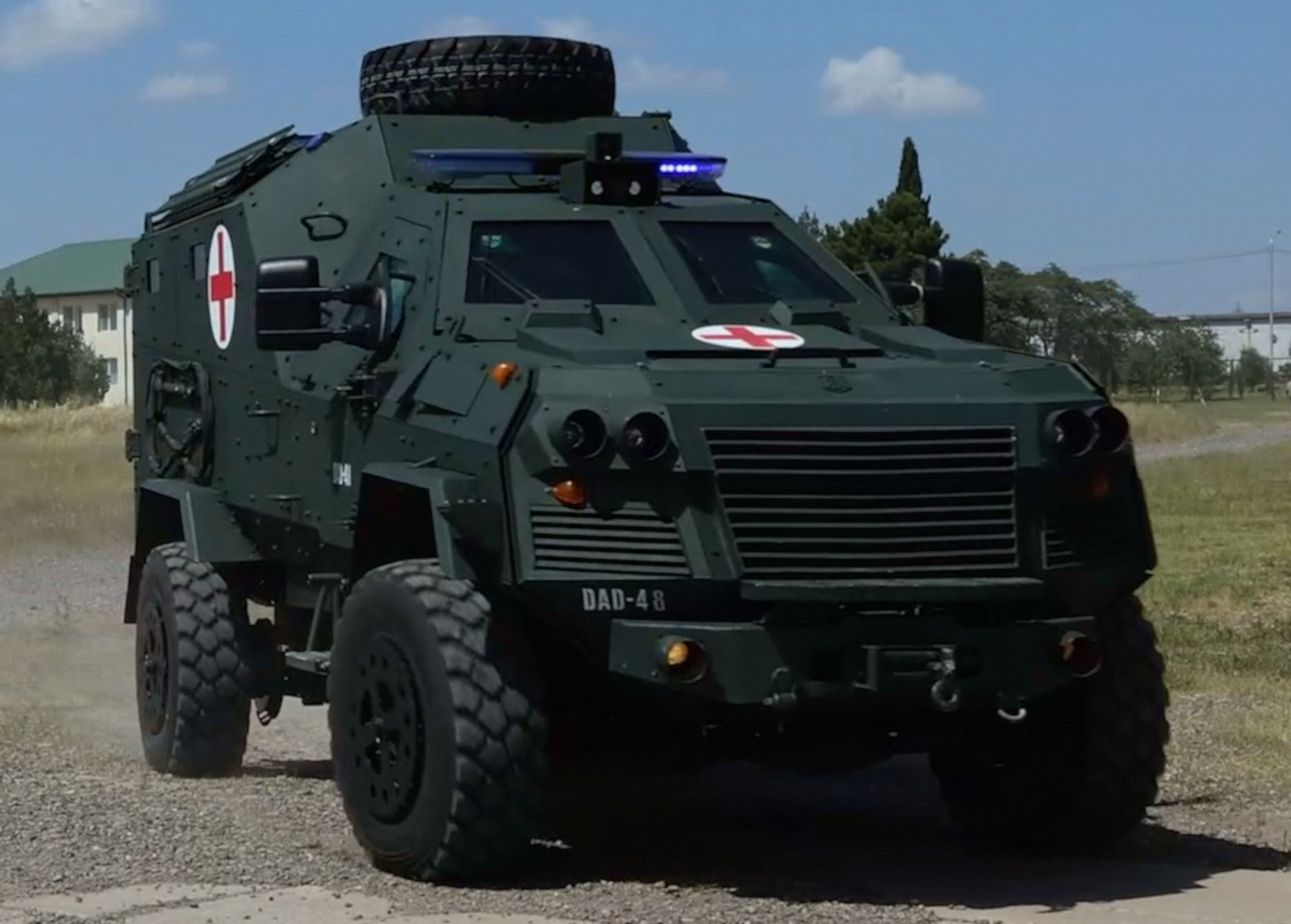
- Type: Armored medical evacuation vehicle
- Place of origin: Georgia

Service history
- In service: 2011–Present
- Used by: Operators

Production history
- Designer: Scientific Technical Center Delta
- Manufacturer: Scientific Technical Center Delta

Specifications
- Mass: 9000 kg (combat weight 9800 kg)
- Length: 6.55 m
- Width: 2.39 m
- Height: 2.20 m
- Crew: 2+4
- Engine: Double turbo diesel engine 356 hp
- Suspension: wheeled 4x4
- Operational range: 500 km
- Maximum speed: 120 km/h

The Didgori Medevac (Georgian: დიდგორი მედევაკი) is a Georgian-made medical armoured personnel carrier developed by the "Delta" research center of the Ministry of Defence of Georgia and part of the Didgori-series APC family currently constructed in five baseline variants.

== Technical characteristics ==
The machine is assembled on and around the chassis of US Ford F-Series pickup trucks. Equipped with thermal imaging cameras front and rear view of FLIR Systems. Information from the cameras is displayed on the three displays: one for the driver, one for the commander and one for the infantry team, established with a system of night vision and also with a special navigation system GPS.

== Armor ==
The construction of the armored medical evacuation vehicle is assembled with armored steel plates – in double layer construction and provides all-around protection according to EN1063 B7+ Standard for the crew located in front, rear medical compartment and engine compartment. The base of the vehicle is manufactured from the layer of armored steel – while the protection level is further enhanced by an add-on armor panels – which can be easily removed or replaced – for replacement of damaged panes, upgrade/downgrade of vehicle protection level, etc.

Armor plates provide protection from 7.62 mm armor-piercing bullets shot from near distance and artillery shell fragments.

== Specifications and mobility ==
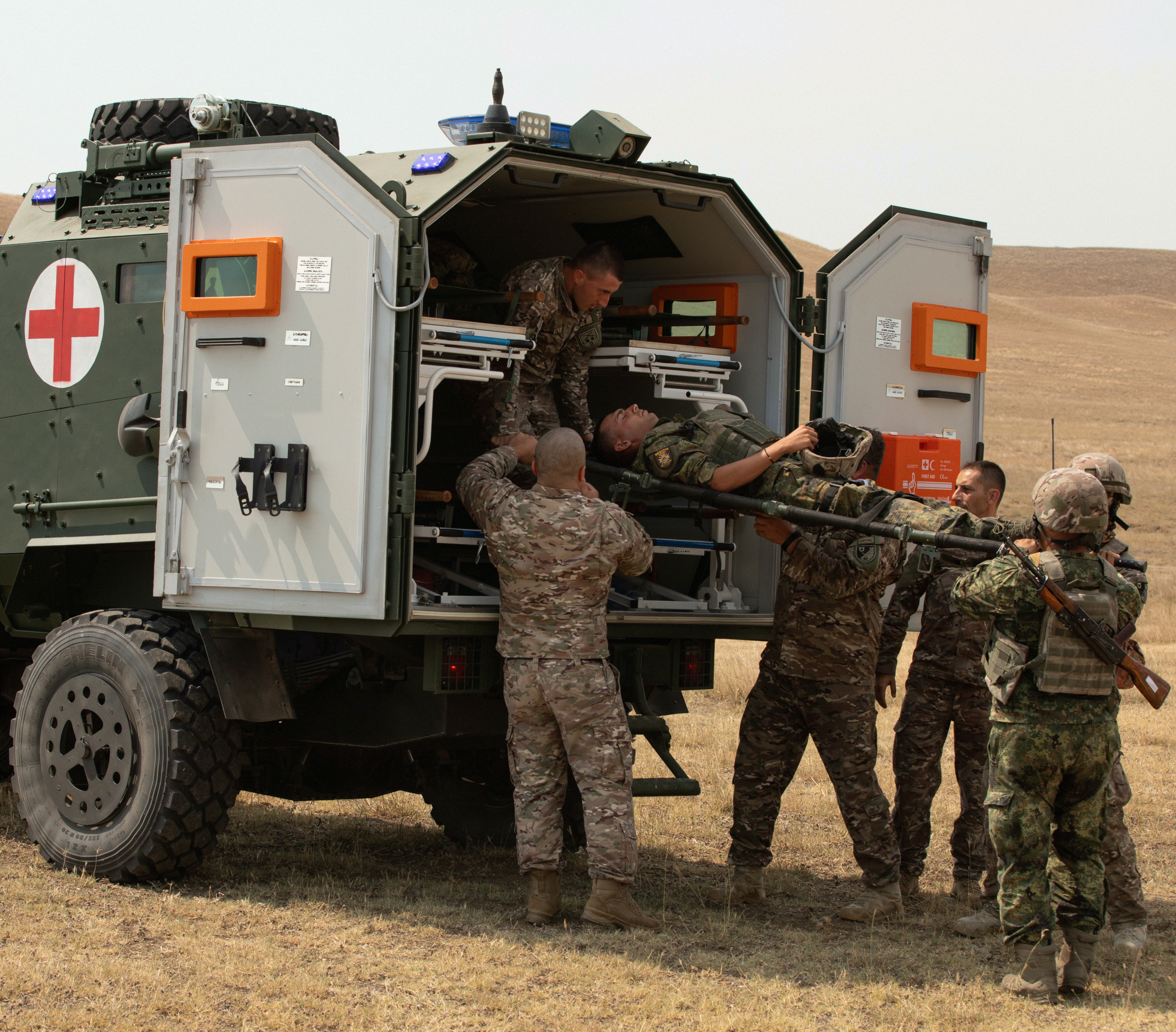
The vehicle's medical module

The Didgori is assembled on and around the chassis of US Ford Super Duty F-550 heavy duty pickup trucks with V8 Power Stroke Turbo Diesel engines and power-assisted hydraulic steering. The product basis choice has proven very effective during trials and in the field on various types of terrain.

The max. speed on paved roads is 120–140 km/h and reduced to 80 km/h on terrain. Acceleration from 0–100 km/h is achieved in 22 seconds. The cruising range at 60 km/h is 500 km. Each unit has at least one 20 L fuel can in reserve. The vehicle can operate at temperatures ranging from -32 °C to +55 °C and remains unaffected by heavy meteorological conditions. The wheels consist of Hutchinson 12r20 mpt80 type tyres which have a run flat capability of 50 km at 50 km/h.

The Didgori has 400mm ground clearance and is able to climb slopes at a 60% gradient and drive sideways along a slope at a 40% gradient. The vehicle base version is not amphibious - although such a variant is an option, but can move in up to 1m deep water.

=== Saudi Arabia trials ===
On August 27, 2014 Georgia participated with a MedEvac prototype in a tender for Armoured Personnel Carriers hosted by the Ministry of Defence of Saudi Arabia. The tests were carried out mostly in the Arabian desert but also urban areas and included movement on different altitudes - mountains, various types of terrain and gradients, weather conditions, under extreme stress and maximum weight burden at top speed. The trials culminated in a 40 km simulated fully loaded evacuation at max.speed.

The Didgori successfully passed every single test with very good results and made it to the finals alongside the US Lenco BearCat after eliminating four other competing vehicles, including the US Oshkosh M-ATV. Even though the Didgori also showed better results than its U.S. finalist counterpart in every single aspect, the winner wasn't announced earlier than January 2016, after months of consulting and evaluation. The Saudi Arabia tender was a very important event to test the vehicle's capabilities in extreme conditions, particularly in a desert environment.

DELTA consequently made necessary adjustments and changes for both its export and home products.

== Operators ==
Map with Didgori family vehicle operators in blue

- Georgia
- Indonesia - Undisclosed number ordered in January 2019
- Saudi Arabia - 100
- Democratic Republic of the Congo - 2

== See also ==
- Oshkosh L-ATV
- Lenco BearCat
- TAD Turangga
