= GNM-60 mkudro =

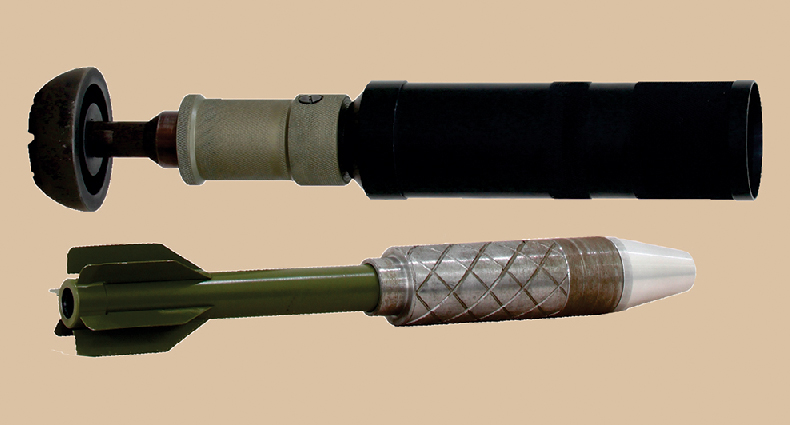
60 mm noiseless mortar GNM-60

The GNM-60 is a 60mm noise reduced mortar designed for special forces and tactical groups for concealed operations. It allows troops to fire while maintaining concealment. The weapon can be operated by a single individual. The mortar is made by STC Delta.

== Technical details ==
Due to the special design of mortar and grenades, the system is relatively light, allowing for easy transport. Its muzzle-loaded system enables conventional operations without additional training.

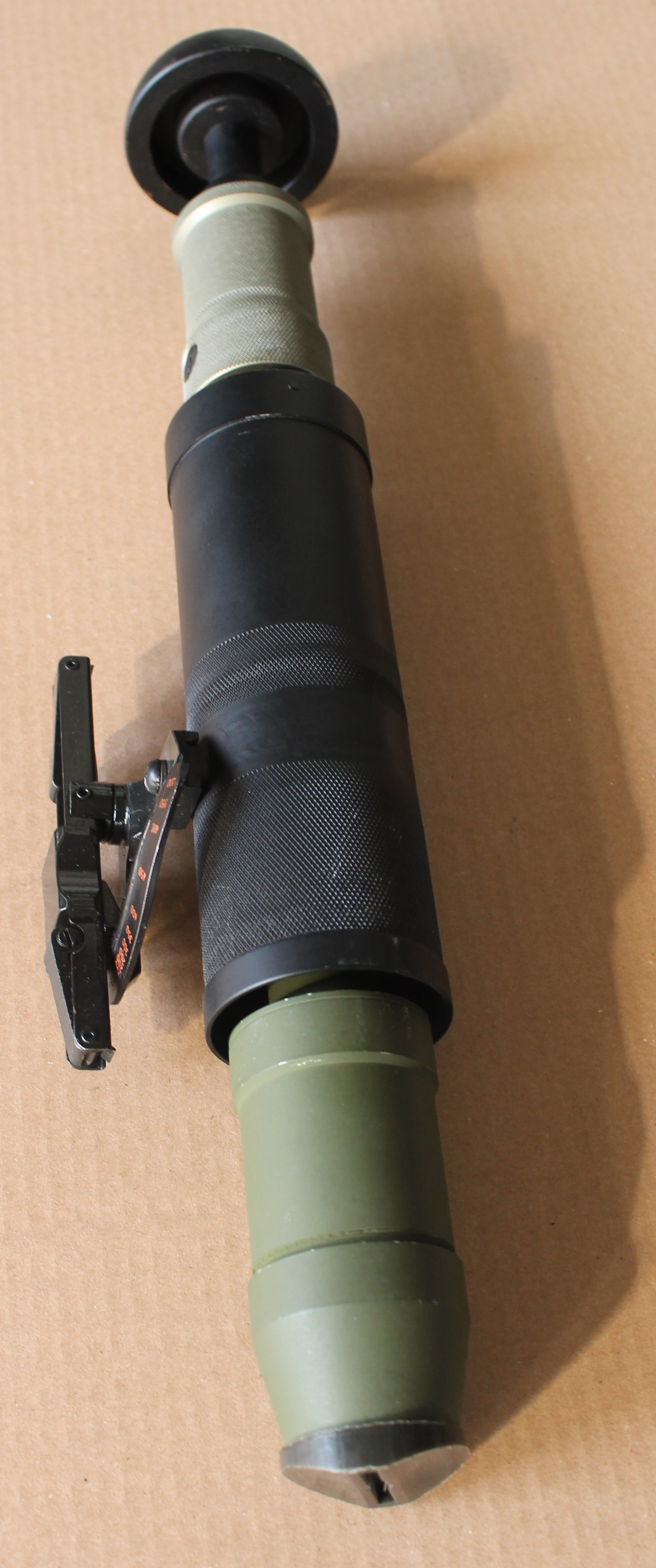
60 mm noiseless mortar GNM-60

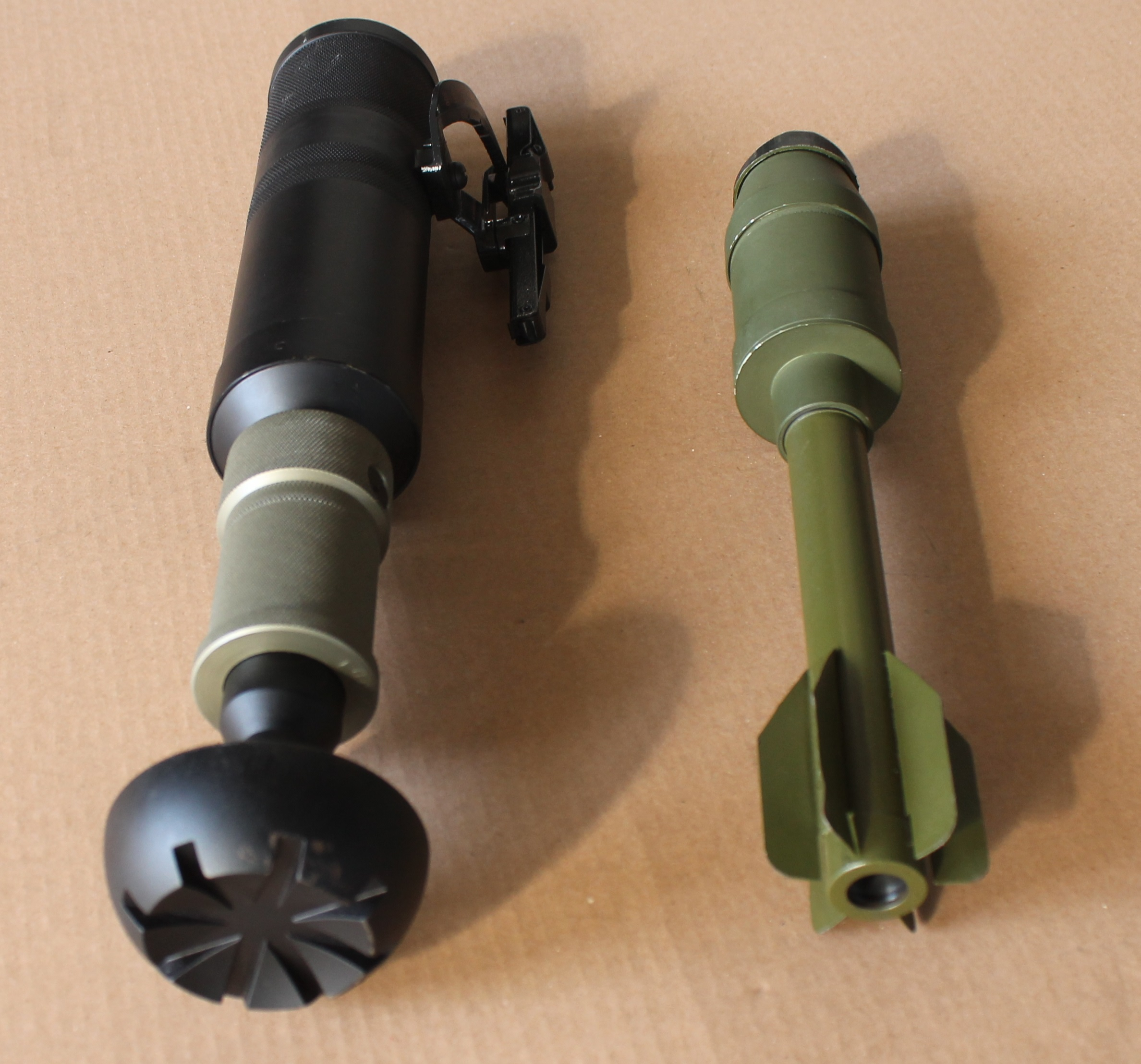
60 mm noiseless mortar GNM-60

=== Technical specification ===
- Caliber - 60 mm (2.4 in)
- Barrel length - 395 mm (15.6 in)
- Weight - 2.5 kg (5.5 lb)
- Elevation
  - Min - 30°
  - Max - 85°
- Range of fire - 450 m (490 yd)
- Rate of fire - 25-30 rounds/min
- Noise level - 69 db
- Life expectancy - 5,000 rounds
- Shell weight - 1.5 kg (3.3 lb)
- Effective casualty radius - 25 m (27 yd)
