= STC Delta =

Georgian defense manufacturer

LEPL - SMSTC Delta
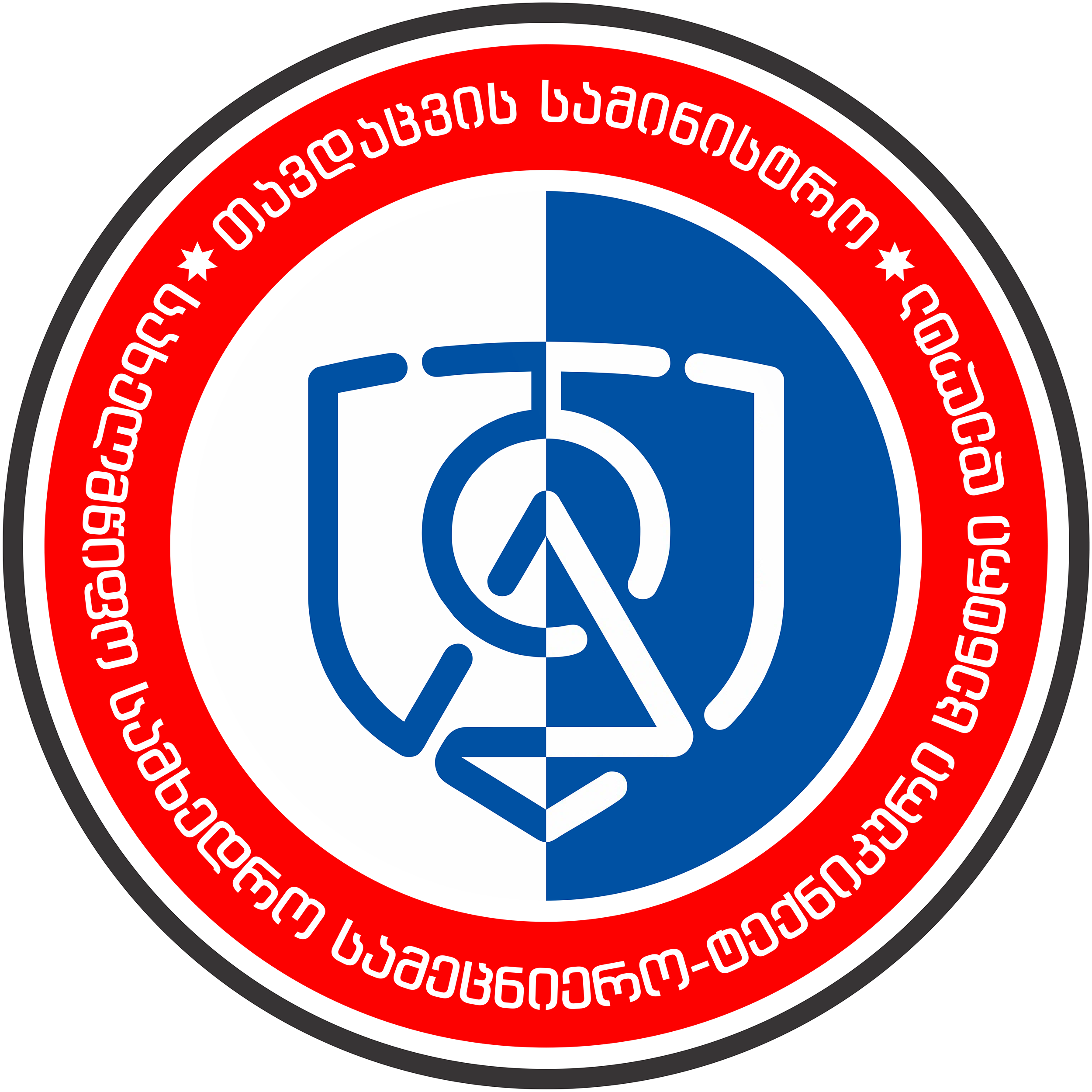

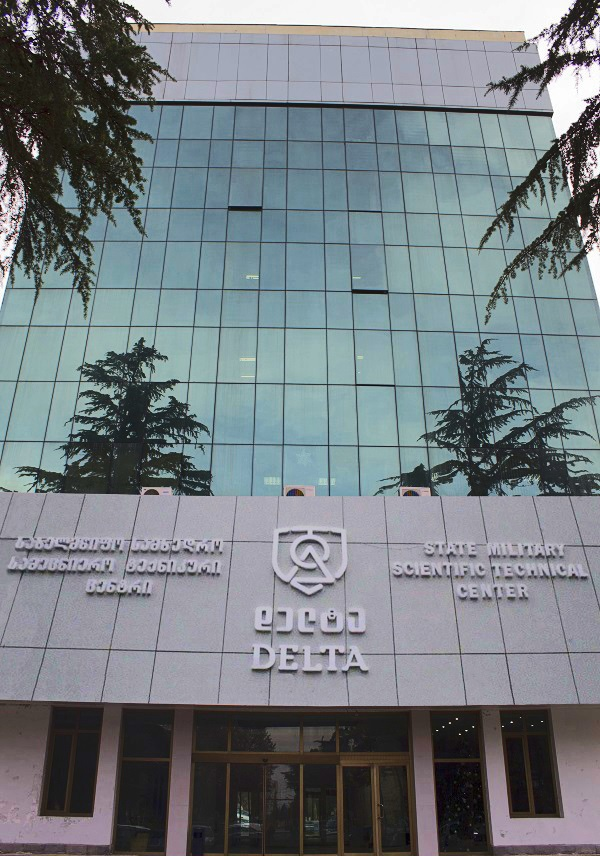
- Headquarters of STC DELTA
- Native name: Georgian: სსიპ - სსსტც დელტა
- Type: State-owned enterprise
- Industry: Defense
- Founded: 2010; 16 years ago
- Headquarters: Tbilisi, Georgia
- Area served: Worldwide
- Key people: Zurab Azarashvili (CEO); Ucha Dzodzuashvili (General Director, 2012–2020)
- Products: Munitions, Small arms, Artillery, Explosives, Combat vehicle, Civil and military aerospace
- Owner: Georgian Ministry of Defense
- Number of employees: ≈2000
- Website: delta.gov.ge

The State Military Scientific-Technical Center "DELTA" (SMSTC Delta) (Georgian: სახელმწიფო სამხედრო სამეცნიერო-ტექნიკური ცენტრი „დელტა“) is a legal entity of public law established by the decree of the President of Georgia. Its full name is Legal Entity of Public Law - State Military Scientific-Technical Center "DELTA". The scope of work of the organization is mainly focused on the Defense Industry and to some extent on the Civilian Field. The Center is an organization separate from state governing bodies. Its state control is exercised by the Ministry of Defense of Georgia. The mission of the organization is based on the state interests of Georgia and the national defense strategy. The Center's primary responsibility is to encourage the growth of the domestic military industry. introduction of cutting-edge military technologies in the design, development, and mass production of combat gear and weapons that are in line with global trends. The only company in Georgia involved in the defense industry is State Military Scientific-Technical Center Delta. Today, “DELTA” has both intellectual and technical resources to design and manufacture both military and civilian products.

== History ==
The history of "Delta" dates back to the 60s, and from the beginning of the 90s the research center was subordinated to the Ministry of Defense of Georgia. Delta in its current state was formed in 2010, when the center was subordinated to six scientific research institutes and the 31st Tbilisi Aircraft Factory. The scope of work of the organization is mainly focused on the defense industry and to some extent on the civilian industry. The center is an organization separate from state governing bodies. Its state control is exercised by the Ministry of Defense of Georgia.

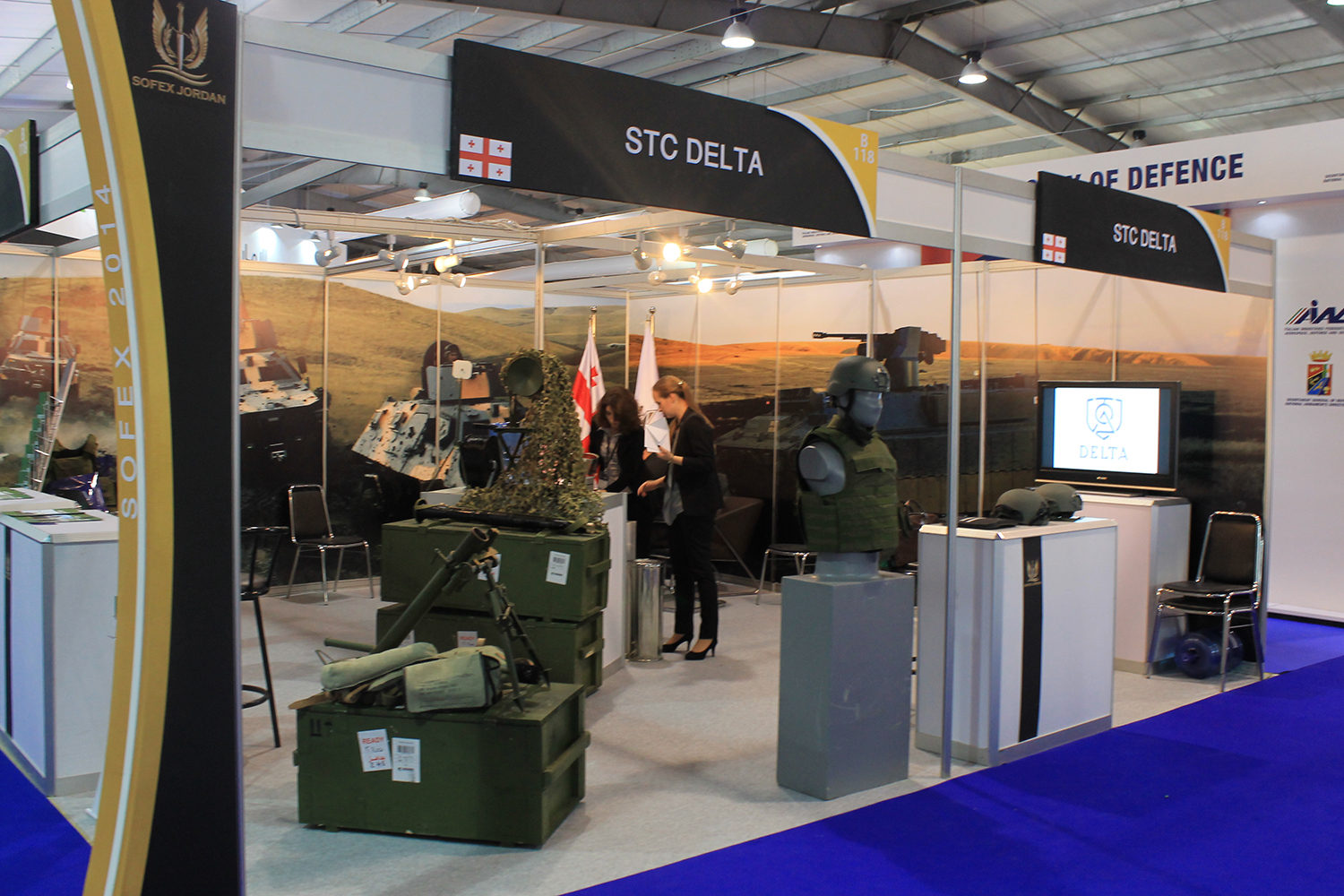
STC Delta at SOFEX 2014 Exhibition

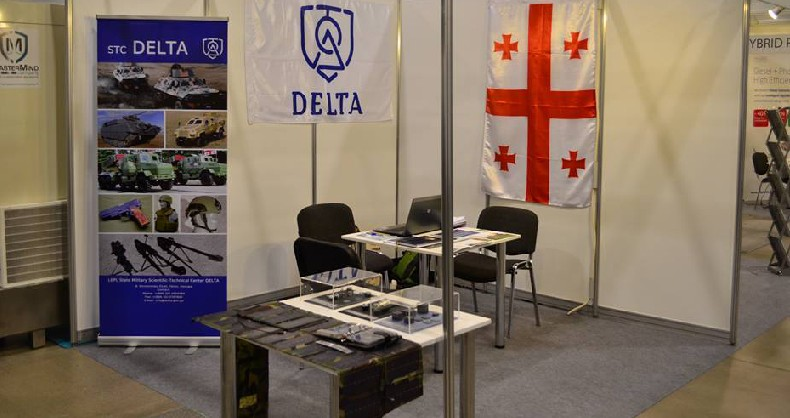
STC Delta at IESMA-2014 Exhibition

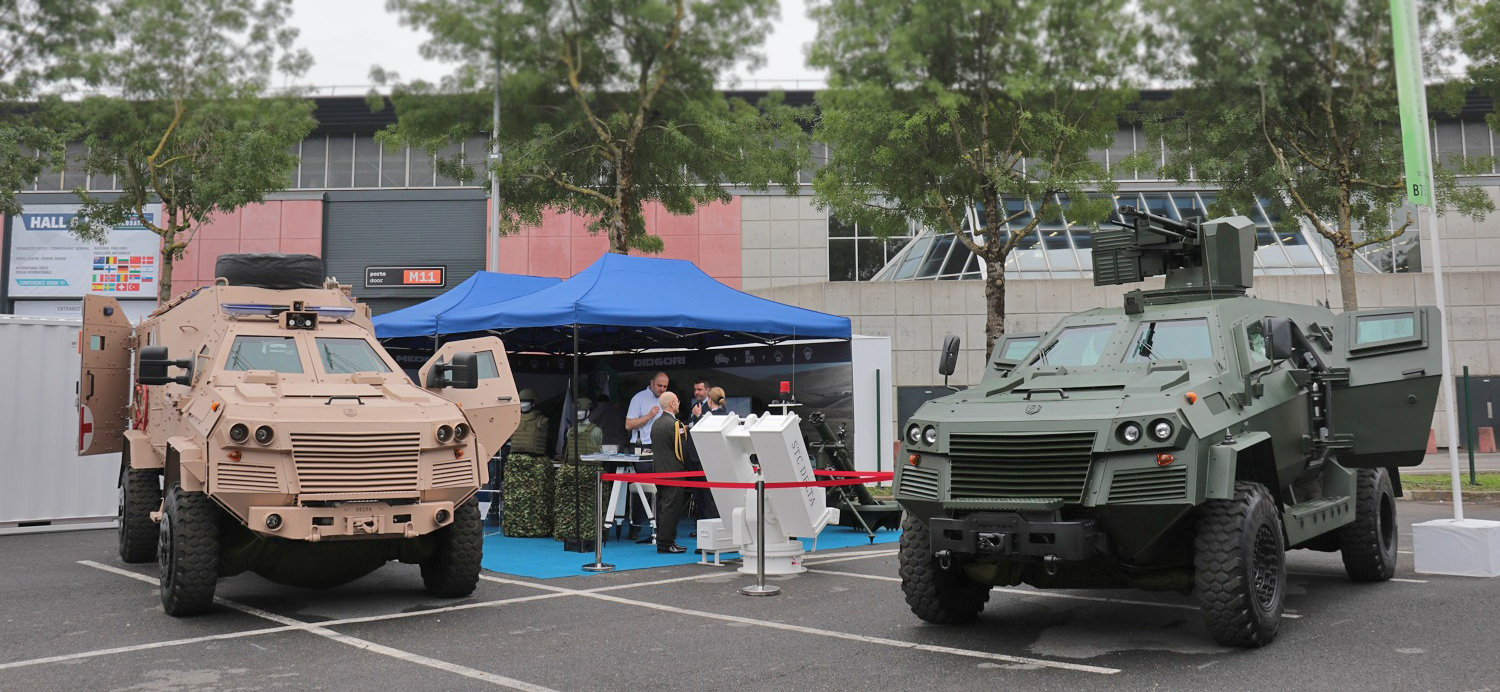
STC Delta at EUROSATORY 2018 Exhibition

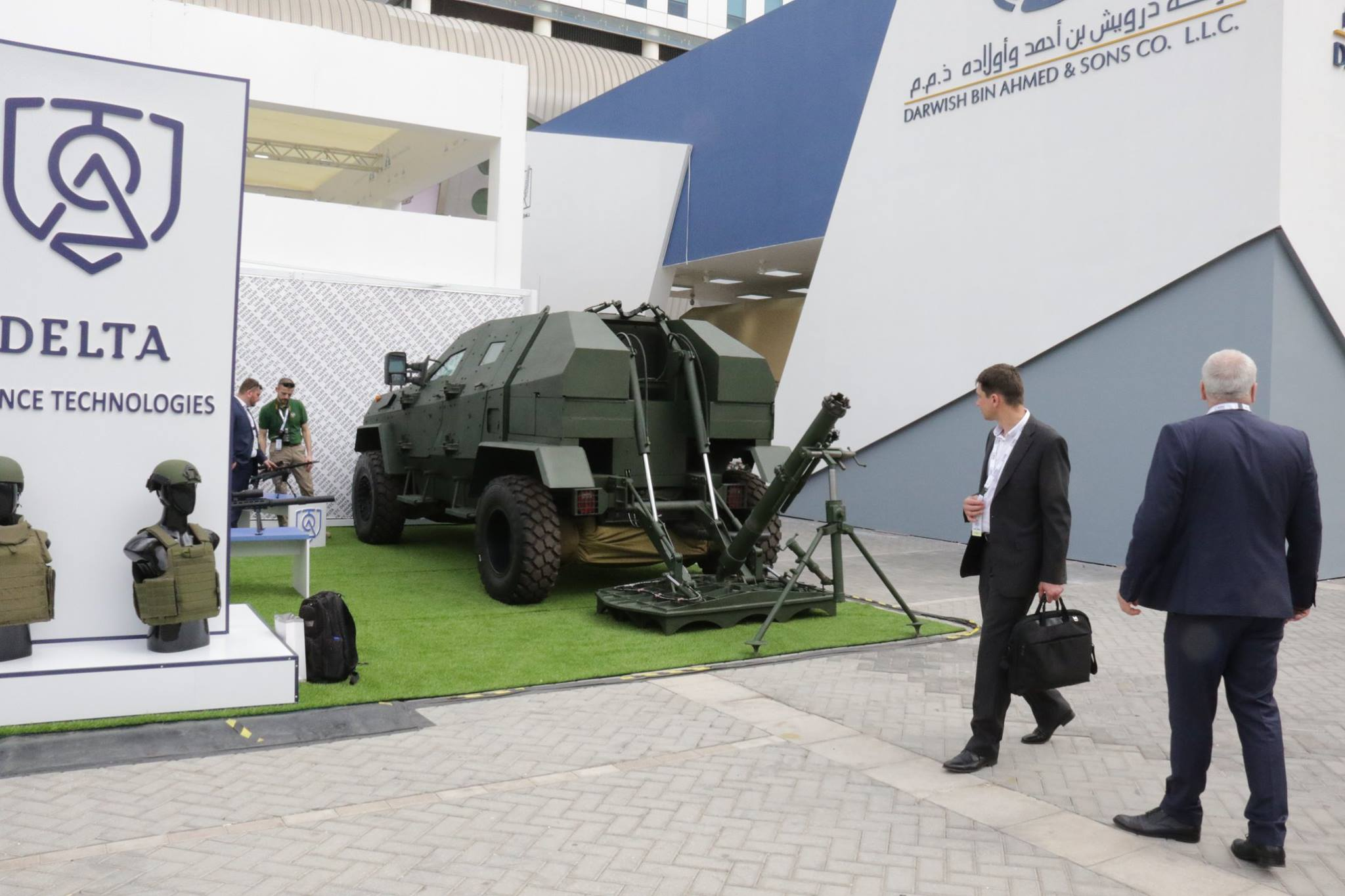
STC Delta at IDEX-2019 Exhibition

== Leadership ==
From 2012 to 2020, Ucha Dzodzuashvili served as the General Director of the State Military Scientific-Technical Center "Delta." During his tenure, Delta significantly expanded its capabilities and reputation in the defense industry, participating in multiple international military exhibitions and delivering groundbreaking projects. Dzodzuashvili's leadership was characterized by innovation, modernization, and the integration of cutting-edge military technologies. Key projects under his guidance included:

- Active Weather Modification System – Anti-Hail Solution: Developed and implemented an autonomous system protecting 600,000 hectares in the Kakheti region, achieving a 96.4% success rate in mitigating agricultural hailstorm damage.
- National Situational Awareness Room (SAR) Software: Managed the development of a comprehensive SAR software solution, contributing to its communication protocols, data exchange routines, and UI design.
- Multi-Role Unmanned Helicopter (500lb Lift Capacity): Transformed the RotorWay EXEC F162 helicopter into a multi-role unmanned system, overseeing flight stabilization, mission control, ground station development, and autonomous piloting using NVIDIA Xavier platforms.
- 2-Axis Stabilized Tracking and Control Systems: Led a multidisciplinary team to develop a system that integrated predictive convolutional neural networks for target acquisition and tracking with day and thermal cameras.
- Autonomous Guidance Systems: Directed the creation of servo-driven control surfaces, successfully testing in wind tunnels and initiating development of target acquisition systems using Jetson Nano and FPGA platforms.
- Unified Simulations Platform: Designed a modular simulation platform based on ARMA 3 for use with ground and aerial systems.
- Modular Mission Vehicles: Supervised mechanical and engineering teams to design and produce cutting-edge modular vehicles, integrating emerging technologies into production workflows.
- High-Mobility Mission-Critical System – Meomari 120: Conceptualized and designed a high-mobility delivery system, integrating hydraulic and embedded electronic systems to meet critical operational requirements.

These projects exemplify Dzodzuashvili's dedication to advancing military and civilian technologies, firmly establishing Delta as a leader in innovation and defense solutions.

== Functions and scope of activities ==
STC Delta representatives worldwide (2018)

- Development, recovery, updating, maintenance and repair of combat weapon, munitions, military equipment and ammunition according to existing legislation of Georgia
- Classification, evaluation of applicability and cost, utilization and realization of expired, unused military equipment, munitions and weapon available in the country
- Processing of explosive agents intended for military and industrial use
- Design and building of military-industrial objects of special purpose
- Development of armor materials, scientific-technical support of security systems of manpower and special objects
- Development and production of control and measuring-metrological devices intended for special military-technical equipment and technological processes
- Development, implementation, recovery, updating, maintenance and repair of optical and electronic devices-machines as well as special-purpose systems and their equipment
- Design, implementation, maintenance and repair of special security systems of military objects and buildings-constructions
- Processing, recovery, updating, maintenance and repair of military-training simulators
- Methodological and hardware support of tests on training area
- Acquisition – storage, transportation and realization of explosive agents, weapons, munitions and their elements according to existing legislation of Georgia
- Coordination and support of humanitarian demining activity;
- Processing, updating, development, implementation and maintenance of systems concerned with avalanche protection and antihail activities in the country;

== Scientific institutes and companies entering into STC “Delta” ==
- Institute “Optics” (Optica);
- Grigol Tsulukidze Mining Institute;
- R. Dvali Machine – Mechanics Institute;
- F. Tavadze Metallurgy and Materials Science Institute;
- Micro and Nano Electronics Institute;
- Ilia Vekua Sokhumi Institute of Physics and Technology

== Important projects ==
Anti-Hail System

In 2015, the State Military-Scientific-Technical Center "DELTA" installed an anti-hail system in the Kakheti region of Georgia. To protect against hail, 85 Launchers and one meteorological radar station were deployed in Kakheti. They are managed remotely from the central control center. The efficiency of the system is 85-95%, which is achieved by the high level of automation and the use of modern technologies. The anti-hail system has been operating since 2018 by the Center for Active Impact on Natural Events Ltd.

Supply of Georgian Defense Forces with State Produced Ballistic Vests and Helmets

Delta has been supplying the Georgian National Defense Forces with personal protective equipment since 2015. Military and special units of the Georgian Defense Forces use MK-I and MK-II type ballistic vests, DH MK-I and DH MK-III military and special use ballistic helmets.

Participation in international military exhibitions

Delta Military Scientific-Technical Center has been participating in international military exhibitions periodically since 1999.

- On October 26–30, 1999, for the first time, Delta presented Georgian-made weapons and equipment abroad at the EXPOMIL-99 International Defense Industry Exhibition in Romania.
- A reorganized Delta presented part of its own products on May 6–8, 2014 at SOFEX 2014, a large-scale international defense industry exhibition in Jordan. Among the exhibits were armored vests, helmets, mortars, RD-7 anti-tank mines and others.
- On November 12–14, 2014, a conference and industrial exhibition IESMA-2014 was held in Vilnius, Lithuania, co-organized by NATO Energy Security Center and LEPL LLC "Delta", where LLC "Delta" was presented with its own display.
- On June 11–15, 2018, the world's largest military exhibition at EUROSATORY, State Military Scientific-Technical Center "DELTA" presented armored vests, helmets, mortars and light weapons Among them, for the first time in history, Delta presented the Georgian armored vehicle DIDGORI, anti-hail systems, at the military exhibition.
- On February 17–21, 2019, at IDEX-2019, the largest exhibition of land, sea and air defense, Delta presented state produced weapons. Among them are three modifications of the armored vehicle "Didgori", personal protection equipment, mortars and light weapons.

== Military and civilian production ==
Product		Image	Role	Notes
Armored personnel carriers
Didgori series armoured personnel carriers.	Didgori-1		Armoured Personnel Carrier	
Didgori series armoured personnel carriers.	Didgori-2		Reconnaissance & Transportation	
Didgori series armoured personnel carriers.	Command and communications vehicle.		Command & Communication	
Didgori series armoured personnel carriers.	Didgori-3		Armoured Personnel Carrier	
Didgori series armoured personnel carriers.	Didgori Medevac		Medical evacuation vehicle	
Didgori series armoured personnel carriers.	Didgori Warrior		armored modular vehicle	
Modernised BRDM-2			Amphibious Armoured Scout Car	
Infantry fighting vehicle
Lazika			Modular infantry fighting vehicle	
Military engineering vehicle
Armored demining & engineering vehicles			Demining	
Civilian Projects
Fire Engine			Fire Engine	
Armored Cash-in-Transit Route Truck			Armored Cash-in-Transit Route Truck	

Product		Image	Notes
Remote-controlled weapons
Remote weapon stations	DRWS-1		
Remote weapon stations	DRWS-2		
Remote weapon stations	RWS-23 Gyro-stabilized remote controlled weapon station		
Artillery
Multiple rocket launcher	RS-122 122 mm MRL.		
Mortar carriers	GMM-120 self-propelled mortar - Experimental Project		
Mortars	GNM-60 mkudro 60 mm noiseless hand mortar		
Mortars	GM-60 60 mm mortar.		
Mortars	GM-82 82 mm mortar.		
Mortars	GM-120 120 mm mortar.		
Mortars	GMM-120 120 mm automated self-propelled mortar module - Experimental Project		
Aviation products
SU-25KM "Scorpion"			
Delta WB Warmate loitering munition			
Delta WB Flyeye reconnaissance UAV			
Georgian UAV unmanned aerial system			
Multi-role unmanned helicopter - Experimental Project			
Air-to-air missiles	R-60 (missile) infrared homing air-to-air missile		
Air-to-air missiles	R-73 (missile) infrared homing air-to-air missile		
Anti-ship missile	AS-2 Kipper(К-10С) nuclear anti-ship missile		

Product				Image	Notes
Small arms, rifles, carbines, grenade launchers and mines
Pistols	9×17mm Scorpion silent pistol - Experimental Project				
Pistols	9×19mm service pistol. - Experimental Project				
Carbines	AR-15–style rifles				Development and production launched in 2021
Submachine guns	Iamani - Experimental Project				
Sniper rifles	PDSHP Anti-material rifles:	12.7×108mm Amr-mod-1 - Experimental Project			
Sniper rifles	PDSHP Anti-material rifles:	12.7×108mm Amr-mod-2 - Experimental Project			
Sniper rifles	Multicaliber modular sniper rifles:	GEBUR GEBUR Lancet .338 LM GEBUR Tactical .338 LM	.338 Lapua Magnum		
Sniper rifles	Multicaliber modular sniper rifles:	Satevari MSWP Satevari .338 GBM Satevari-2 .338 LM	.300 Norma Magnum		
Sniper rifles	Multicaliber modular sniper rifles:	Satevari MSWP Satevari .338 GBM Satevari-2 .338 LM	.308 Winchester		
Sniper rifles	Multicaliber modular sniper rifles:	Satevari MSWP Satevari .338 GBM Satevari-2 .338 LM	.338 GBM		
Sniper rifles	Multicaliber modular sniper rifles:	Satevari MSWP Satevari .338 GBM Satevari-2 .338 LM	.375 GBM		
Sniper rifles	Multicaliber modular sniper rifles:	Satevari MSWP Satevari .338 GBM Satevari-2 .338 LM	.338 Lapua Magnum		
Sniper rifles	Multicaliber modular sniper rifles:	Satevari MSWP Satevari .338 GBM Satevari-2 .338 LM	.50 BMG		
Sniper rifles	DELTA-308 - Experimental Project				
Anti-armour weapons	RPG-7 RPG-7G upgraded version of RPG-7.				
Anti-armour weapons	PDM-1 one-shot disposable grenade launcher.				
Grenade launchers	UBGL-1 40×46mm under-barrel grenade launcher (M4).				
Grenade launchers	AG-40D 40×46mm under-barrel grenade launcher (AK-74).				
Grenade launchers	GP-25 40×46mm under-barrel grenade launcher (AKM / AK-74).				
Mines	RD-7 off-route anti-tank mine.				
Other items
Suppressors	5.45×39mm suppressors for AK-74s.				
Suppressors	5.56×45mm NATO suppressors for M4 carbines.				
Suppressors	.338 Lapua Magnum suppressors for SRS sniper rifles.				
Blank-firing adaptors					
Bulletproof vests	Mk I modular tactical vest				
Bulletproof vests	Mk II modular plate carrier				
Bulletproof helmets	DH MK I general purpose army helmet.				
Bulletproof helmets	DH MK II tactical helmet.				
Bulletproof helmets	DH MK III tactical helmet.				
Hand Grenades					
Watchtower	3–12 m guard towers				
Tents	various types and sized military tents.				
Military beds					
Continuous tracks	Rubber Pads / track shoes for tracked military vehicles.				
