= Didgori-2 =

Didgori-1
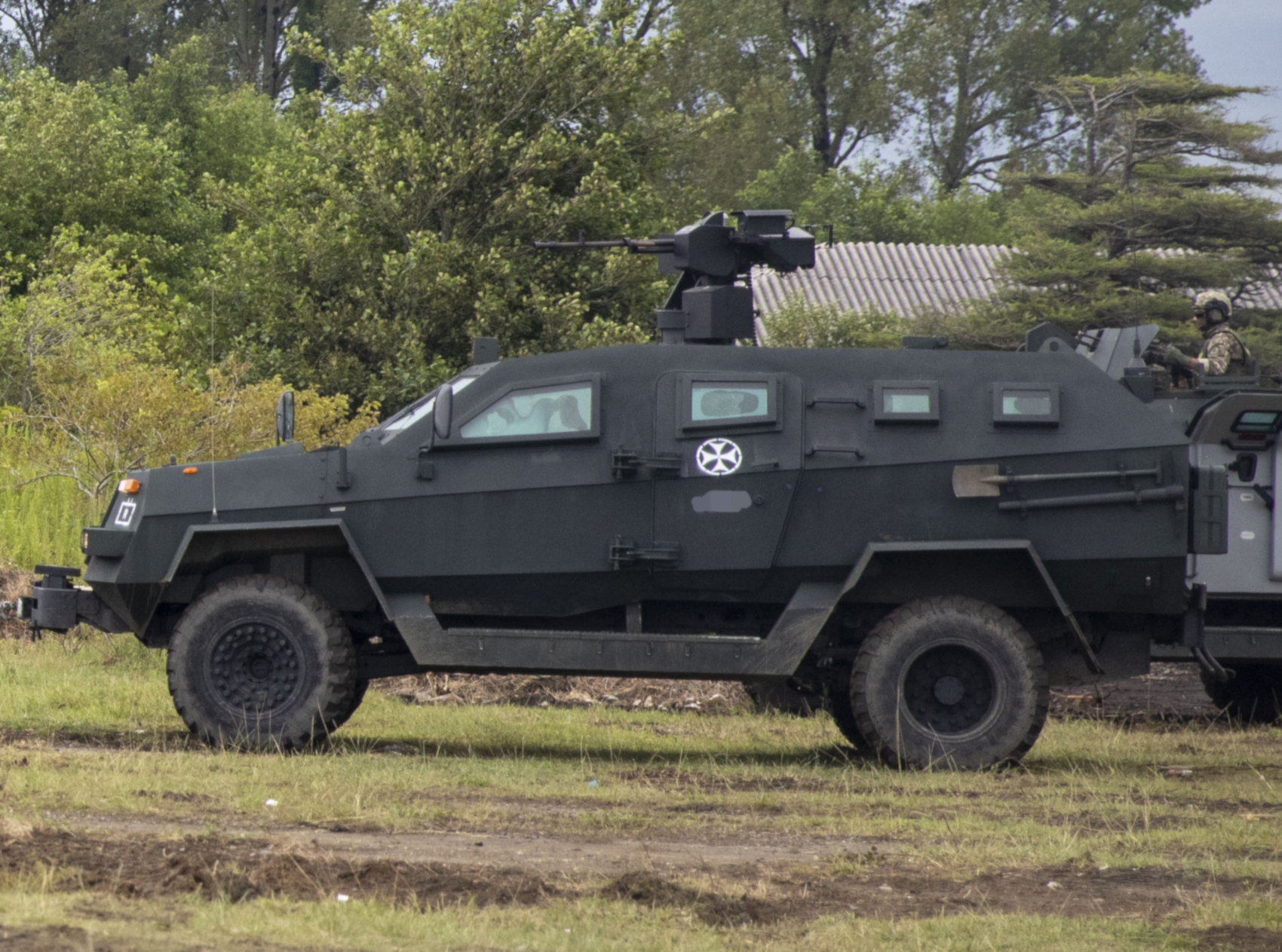
- Didgori-1 side view
- Type: Armoured Reconnaissance and Transport vehicle
- Place of origin: Georgia

Service history
- In service: 2011–present
- Used by: Operators
- Wars: Yemeni civil war (2014–present)

Production history
- Designer: Scientific Technical Center Delta
- Manufacturer: Scientific Technical Center Delta
- No. built: first batch in 2011 included 15 vehicles

Specifications
- Mass: 8059 kg (combat weight 8855 kg)
- Crew: 3(2)+6(7)
- Main armament: 7.62×51 mm M134 Minigun or 12.7×108 mm NSV machine gun Optional: RCWS with twinned 12.7 mm and secondary 7.62 mm machineguns
- Engine: twin turbocharged V8 engine 351 hp
- Suspension: wheeled 4×4
- Operational range: 500 km
- Maximum speed: 120 km/h maximum speed on paved roads 80 km/h off-road 50 km/h with damaged tires

The Didgori-II (Georgian: დიდგორი-II) is an armoured multi-role and special operations vehicle produced by STC Delta. It was developed in 2009, alongside the Didgori-1 using the same internal features with some additional functions. The armoured personnel carrier is thought to provide transport, enhanced visibility and firepower support for infantry troops and Special Forces in various missions including reconnaissance and convoy protection.

== Specifications and mobility ==
The Didgori is assembled on and around the chassis of US Ford Super Duty F-550 heavy duty pickup trucks with V8 Power Stroke Turbo Diesel engines and power assisted hydraulic steering. The product basis choice has proven very effective during trials and in the field on various types of terrain.

The max. speed on paved roads is 120–140 km/h and reduced to 80 km/h on terrain. Acceleration from 0–100 km/h is achieved in 22 seconds. The cruising range at 60 km/h is 500 km. Each unit has at least one 20-litre fuel can in reserve. The vehicle can operate at temperatures ranging from -32 °C to +55 °C and remains unaffected by heavy meteorological conditions. The wheels consist of Hutchinson 12r20 mpt80 type tyres which have a run flat capability of 50 km at 50 km/h.

The Didgori has 400 mm ground clearance and is able to climb slopes at a 60% gradient and drive along a transverse slope of 40%. The vehicle base version is not amphibious – although such a variant is an option, but can move in up to 1 m deep water.

=== Saudi Arabian trials ===
On 27 August 2014, Georgia participated with a MedEvac prototype in a tender for armoured personnel carriers hosted by the Ministry of Defence of Saudi Arabia. The tests were carried out mostly in the Arabian desert but also urban areas and included movement on different altitudes - mountains, various types of terrain and gradients, weather conditions, under extreme stress and maximum weight burden at top speed. The trials culminated in a 40 km simulated fully loaded evacuation at maximum speed.

The Didgori passed every test with very good results and made it to the finals alongside the American Lenco BearCat after eliminating four other competing vehicles, including the American Oshkosh M-ATV. Even though the Didgori also showed better results than its American finalist counterpart in every aspect, the winner was not announced earlier than January 2016, after months of consulting and evaluation. The Saudi Arabian tender was a very important event to test the vehicle's capabilities in extreme conditions, particularly in a desert environment.

DELTA consequently made necessary adjustments and changes for both its export and home products.

== Electronic equipment ==
Every base variant is equipped with thermal imaging and night vision FLIR Systems attached to the front and rear end, as well as underneath the hull on each side. Information from the cameras is displayed on three monitors: one for the driver, one for the commander and one for the passengers. A special navigation system GPS is installed on the vehicle in order to provide additional information via short message service (SMS) to the crew. The system works in any meteorological condition contrary to other GPS systems.

According to the developer, the vehicle can operate at full capacity in an environment with temperatures ranging from -32 °C to +55 °C without damaging the electronics. All systems operate on 24V DC on a 200 amp alternator with a 78amp/hr battery. The vehicle has no standard issue radio mount thus can be equipped according to army requirements or customer preferences.

== Armament ==
The standard main armament consists of a M134 minigun mount, open turret drive shafts rotational unit - external or air flow. The firing rate can be adjusted from 300 to 6,000 rounds per minute. Total mount weight is 22.7 kg without the ammunition feed system. Primary ordnance is the 7.62×51mm NATO. Ammunition capacity can range from 1,500 (total weight 58 kg) to 4,500 (total weight 134 kg) rounds. Optionally the standard armament can be a 12.7×108 mm DShK or NSV machine gun.

The latest variants have DRWS-1 remote weapon stations equipped with twinned 12.7 mm machineguns and one 7.62 mm lmg attached. Alternatively grenade launchers, ATGMs and short range low-altitude air defence weapons can be fitted on the vehicle.

== Protection ==
Depending on build and in combination with the vehicle's angled design, which is described as monocoque, Didgoris can offer either STANAG 4569 level II or level III protection against small arms fire, including 7.62x39 mm and 7.62x54 mm AP / steel core rounds. The engine and crew compartment areas are encased in double armour layers and withstand mines and other explosives in accordance with STANAG 4569 Level 2A.

A 28 minute long combat footage from 2016 in Yemen demonstrated that a Didgori was capable of withstanding direct hits from rocket-propelled grenades and machine gun fire, which forced the ambushing Houthi fighters to get very close to the vehicle in order to destroy it. The Didgori reportedly remained operational after it was caught in a mine detonation. However its front suspension eventually broke off from the chassis when hurriedly trying to leave the battlefield on jumpy terrain, likely as a result of the sustained blast damage.

The crew seats are specially designed to disperse blasts. Didgoris are equipped with run-flat tires, enabling them to drive on with damaged tires a distance of 50 km at 50 km/h maximum speed. Additionally, a central tire inflation system can be installed to further increase their survivability. All four wheel flanges are ballistic.

The exact composition of the armour material is classified.

== Variants ==
- Armoured personnel carrier
- Patrol, convoy protection
- Command / Communications Vehicle
- Armoured MedEvac
- Mortar carrier
- Reconnaissance vehicle

== Civilian use ==
A number of unarmed variants of the Didgori are deployed in several regions of Georgia as cloud dispersal units which have DELTA manufactured "CD-56" hail suppression system mounted on them. They are linked to regional weather surveying spheres automatically initializing hail suppression procedures if a hailstorm is imminent.

A customized version of the Didgori-II is also featured in the 2021 movie Fast & Furious 9.

== Operators ==
Map with Didgori operators in blue

- Georgia - 40 Didgoris were acquired by the Georgian Defense Forces in 2020.
- Saudi Arabia - Up to 100 Didgoris are in service of the Saudi Arabian Army. The AMEV modification took part in an extensive two year-long Saudi Arabia tender, eliminating eight foreign competitors and their counterparts in the process - including US and Poland. As a result, a US$40 million contract was signed in 2015 for more than 100 vehicles of various configurations. The first batch - 12 vehicles, exclusively for medevac purposes, has been delivered in January 2016. Three Didgoris were lost in the Yemen conflict since 2016.
- Indonesia - An undisclosed number of the AMEV BISON variant were delivered to the Indonesian Mobile Brigade Corps in 2019 and 2020.

=== Failed contracts ===
- Democratic Republic of Congo: In 2015, the Democratic Republic of Congo placed an order for 12 Didgori armored vehicles from Georgia, manufactured by the State Military Scientific-Technical Center “Delta”. However, the deal was not finalized. Officials from the Ministry of Defence of Georgia later stated that the terms of the agreement were not satisfactory, leading to its cancellation.

== Gallery ==
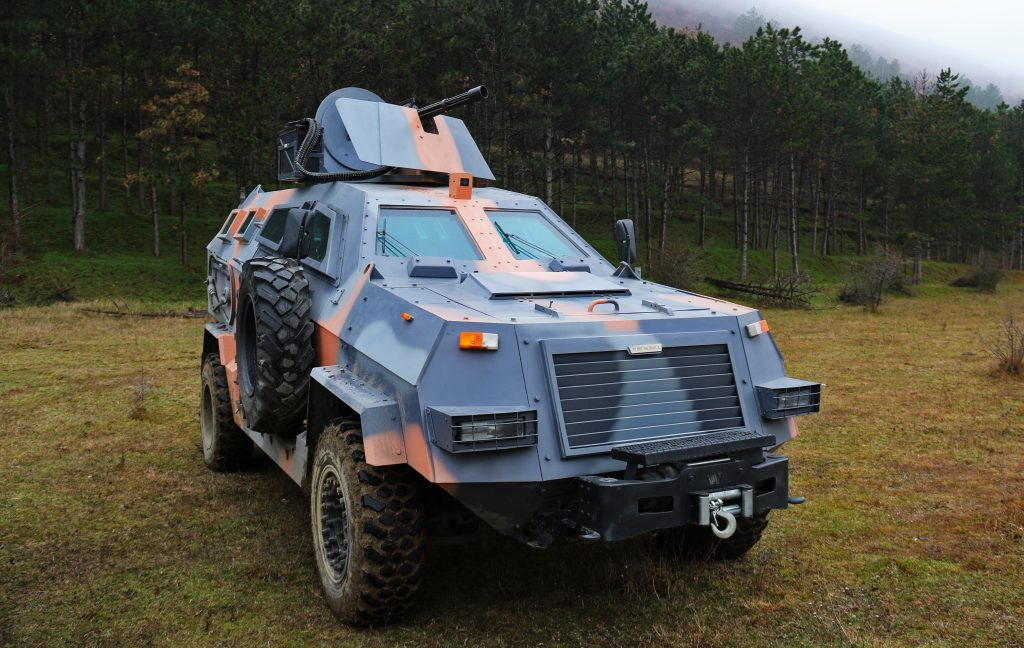

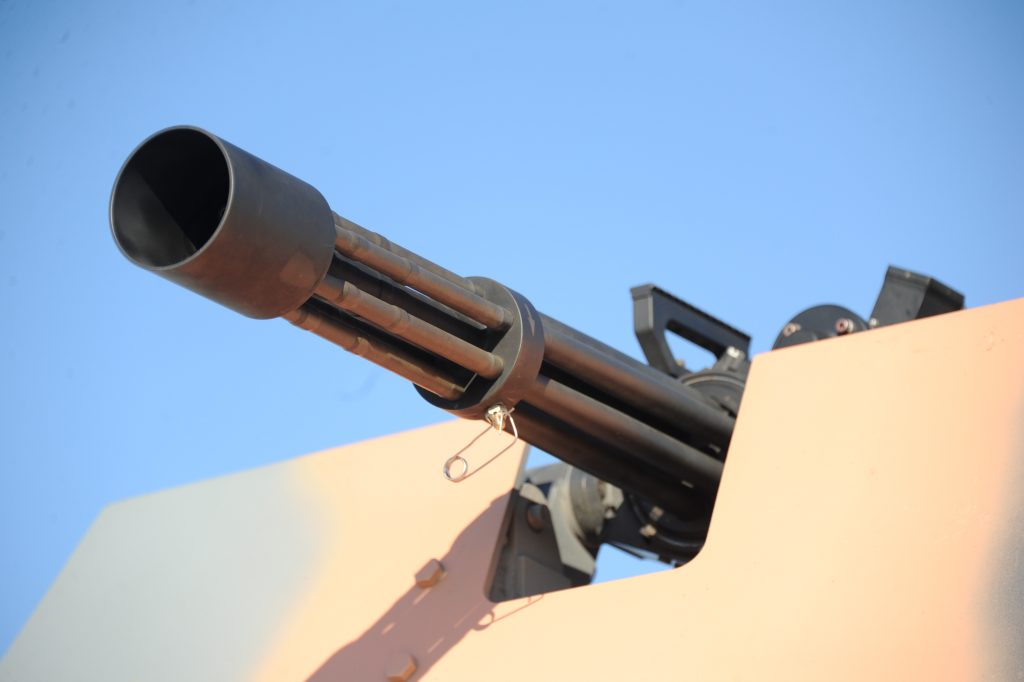

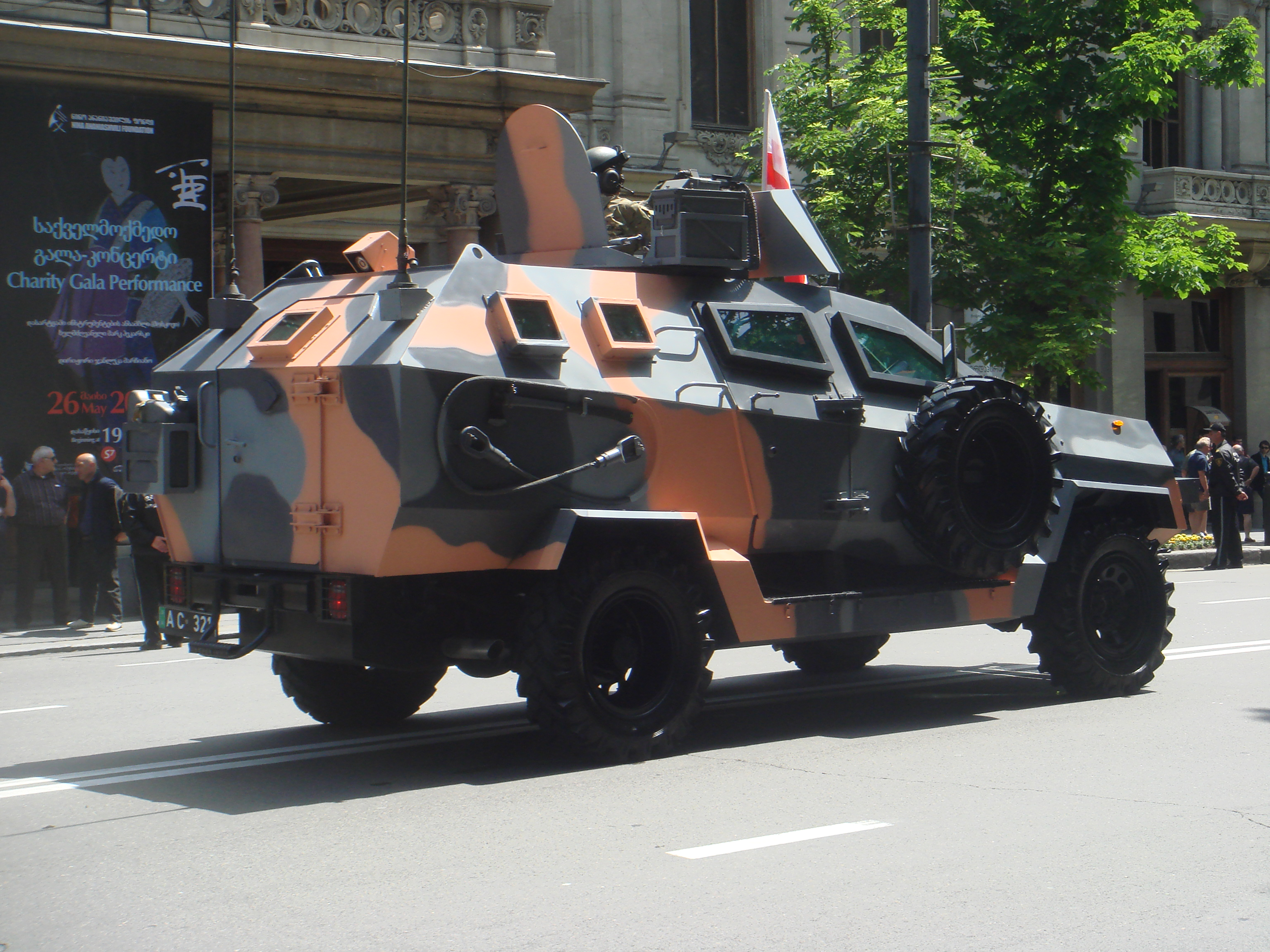

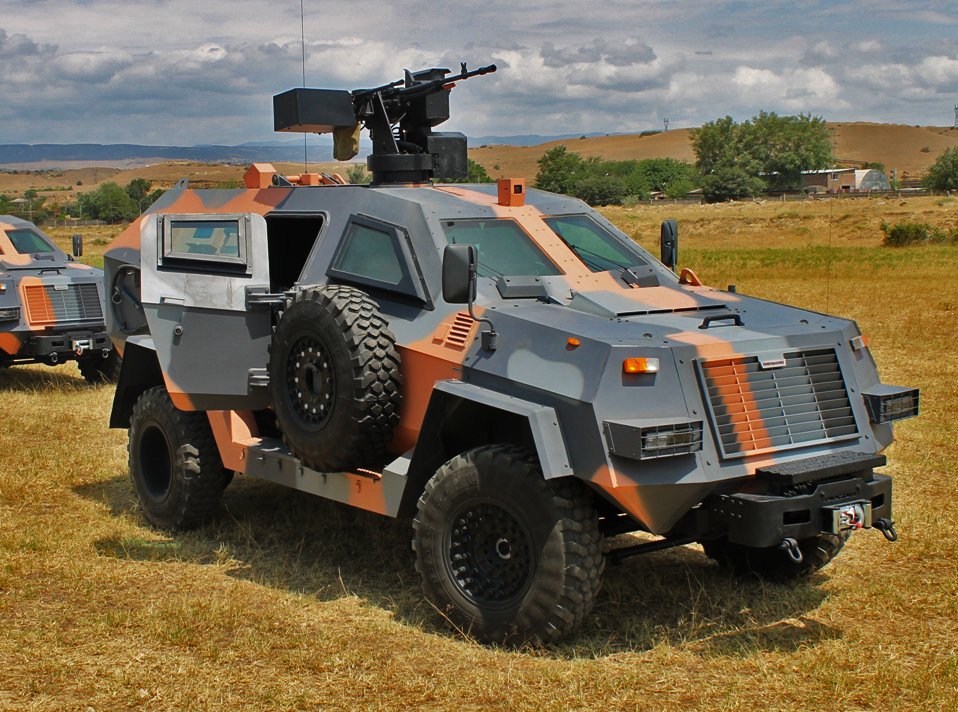

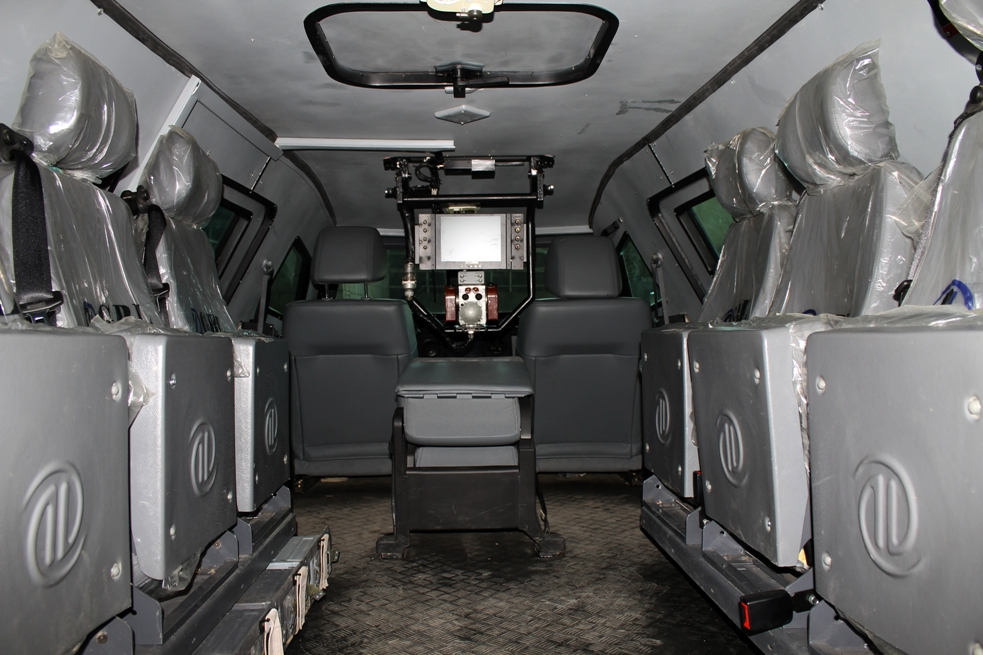

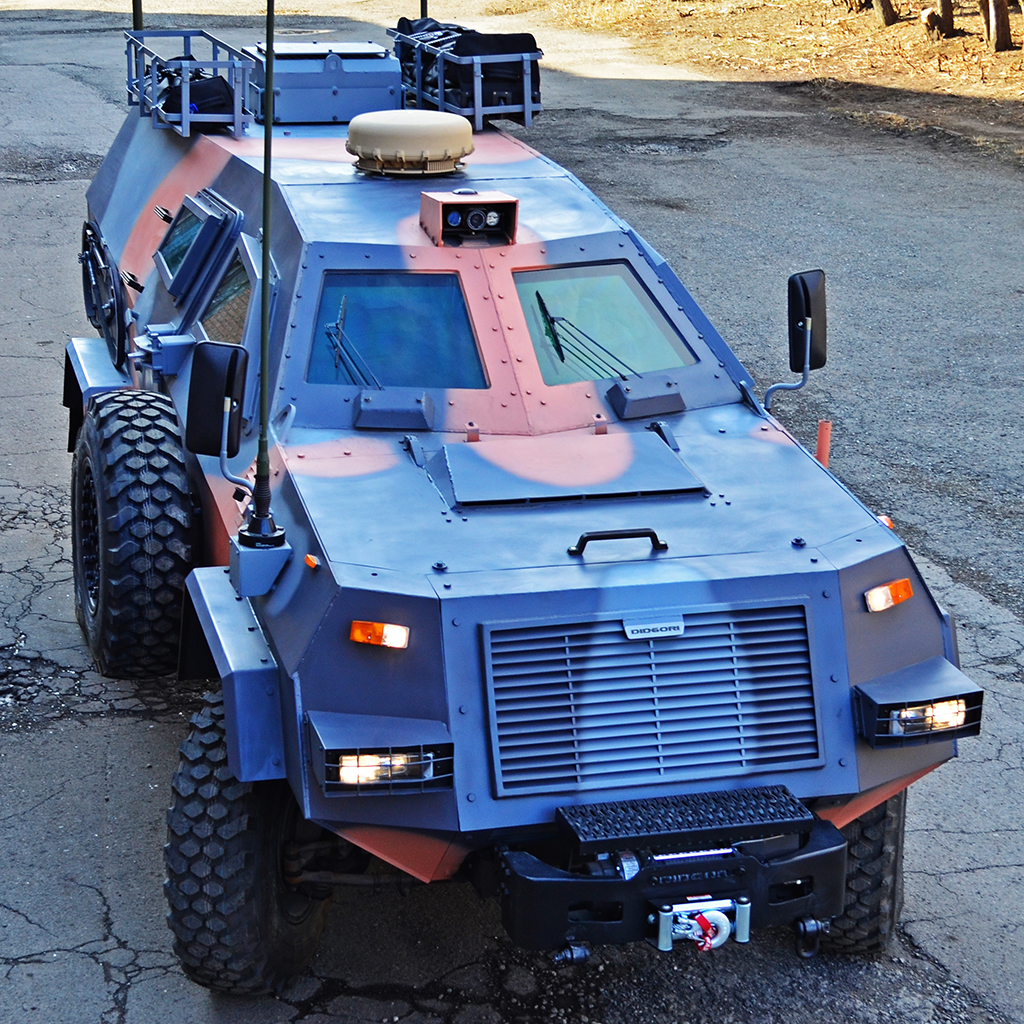

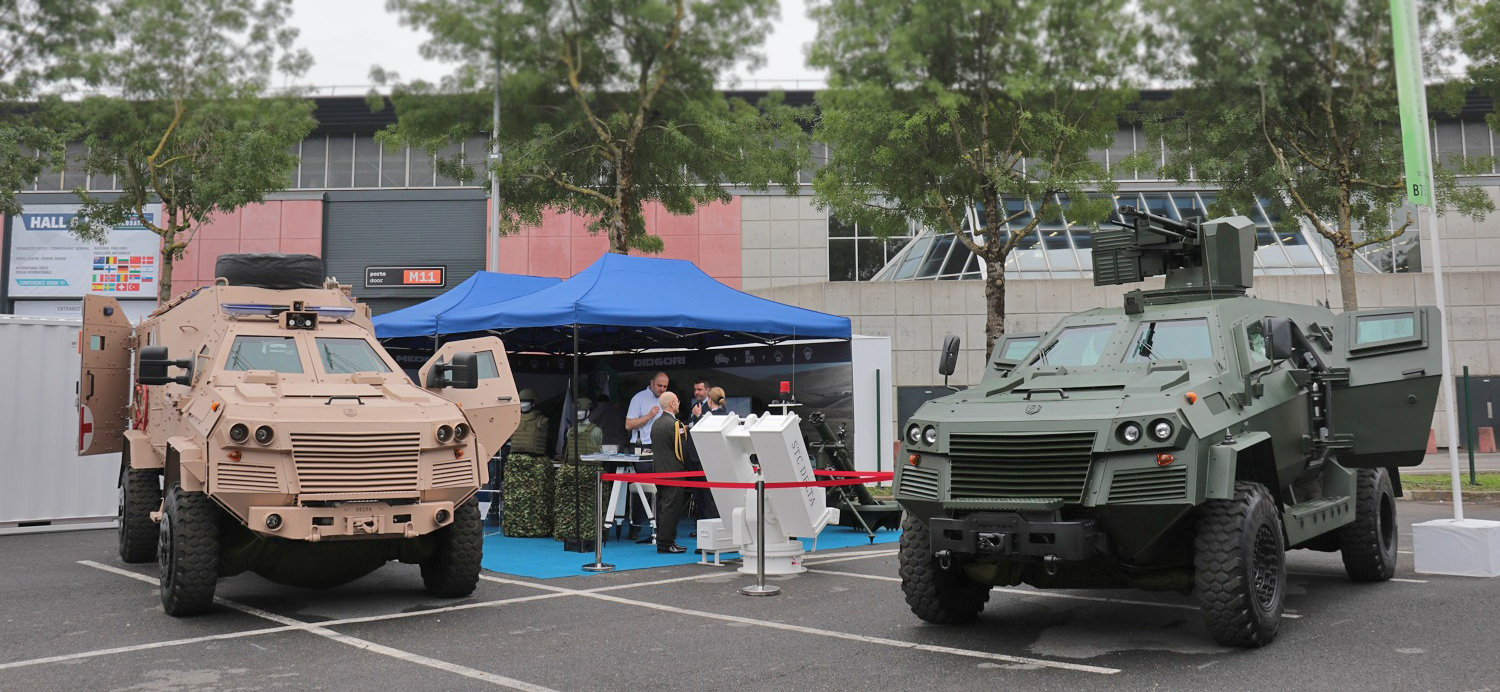

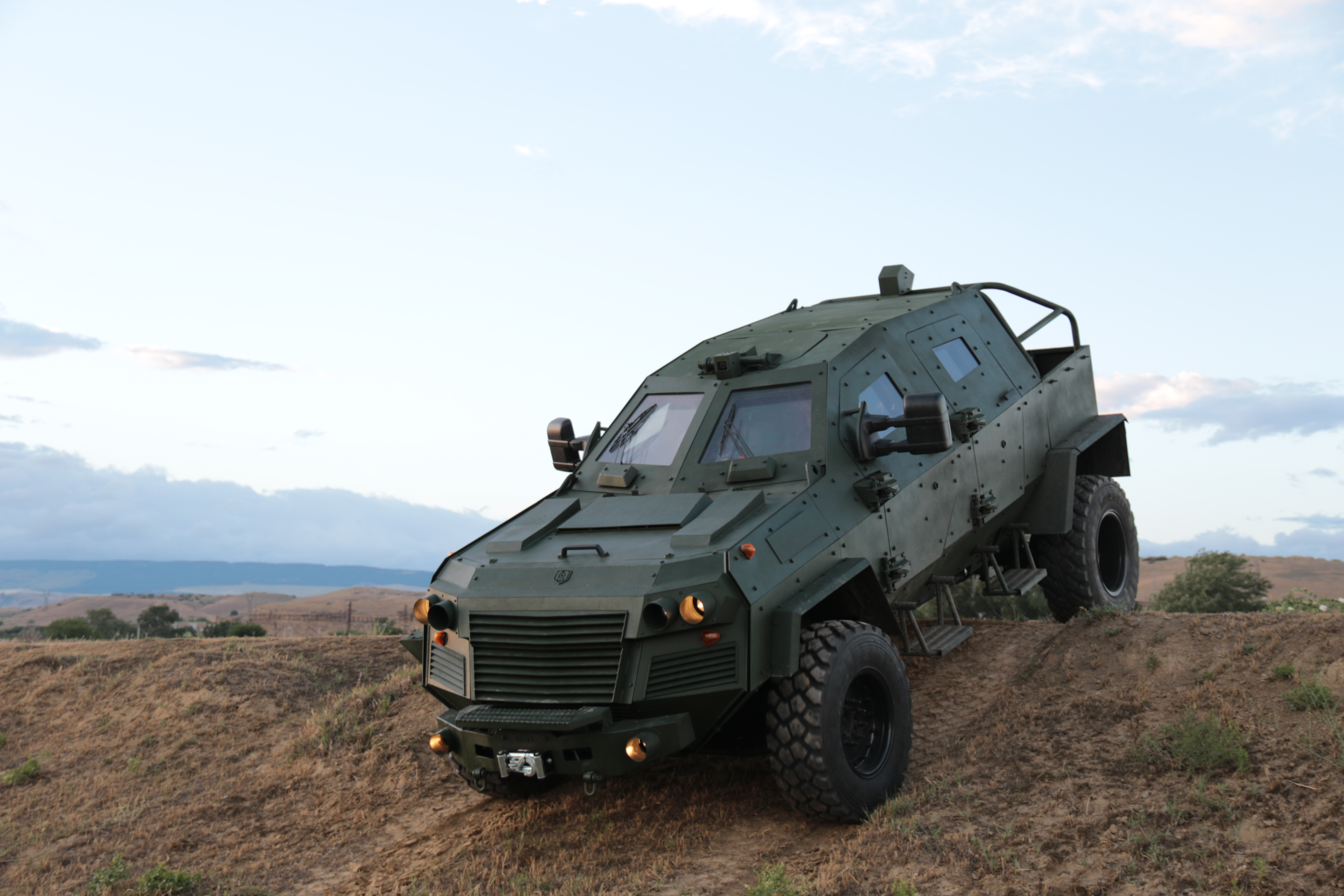

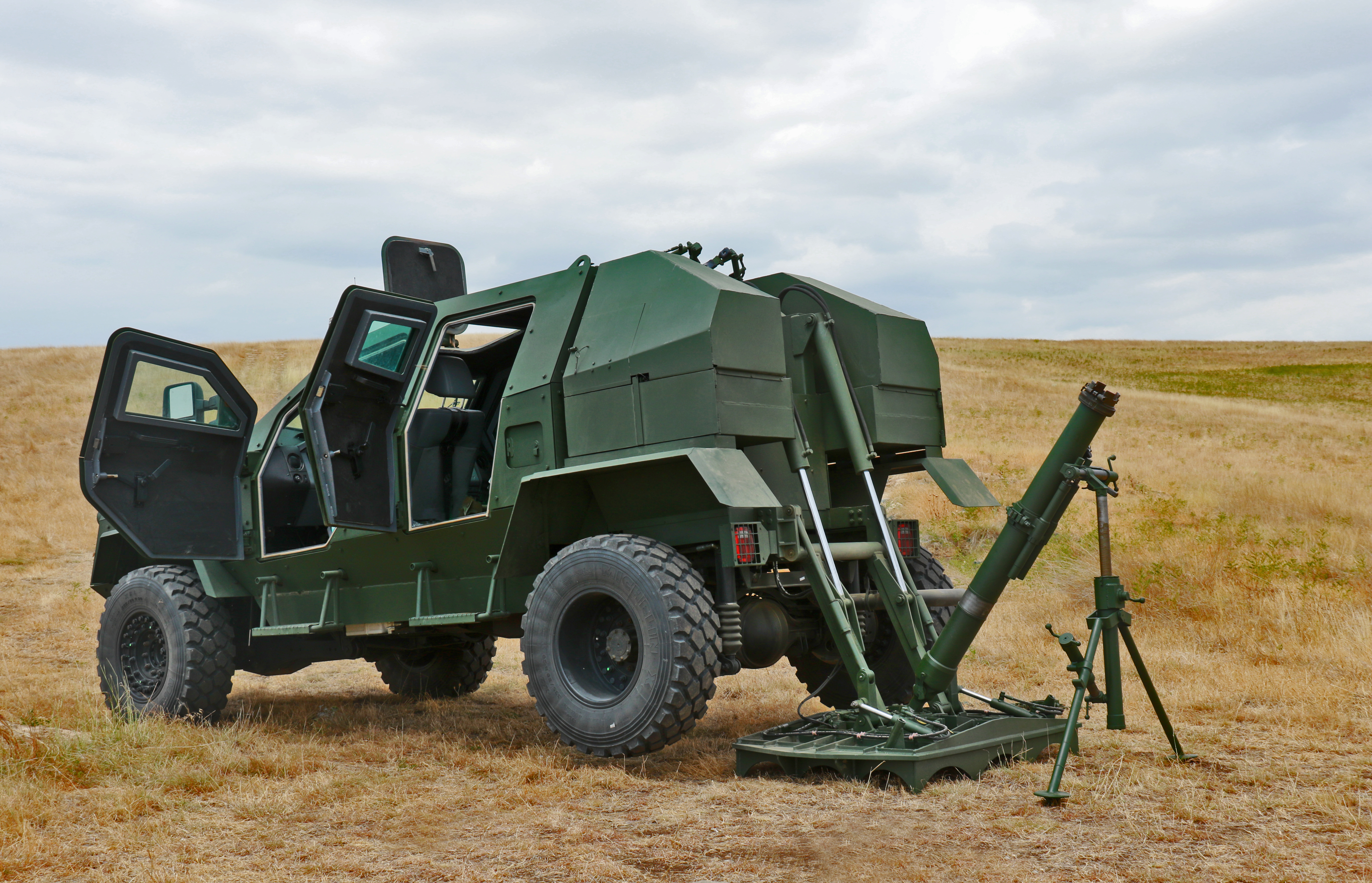

== See also ==
- Didgori-1 – (Georgia)
- VPK-3927 Volk – (Russia)
- Oshkosh L-ATV – (United States)
- GAZ Tigr – (Russia)
- Otokar Cobra – (Turkey)
- HMMWV – (United States)
- Lazika – (Georgia)
