= Didgori-1 =

Didgori I
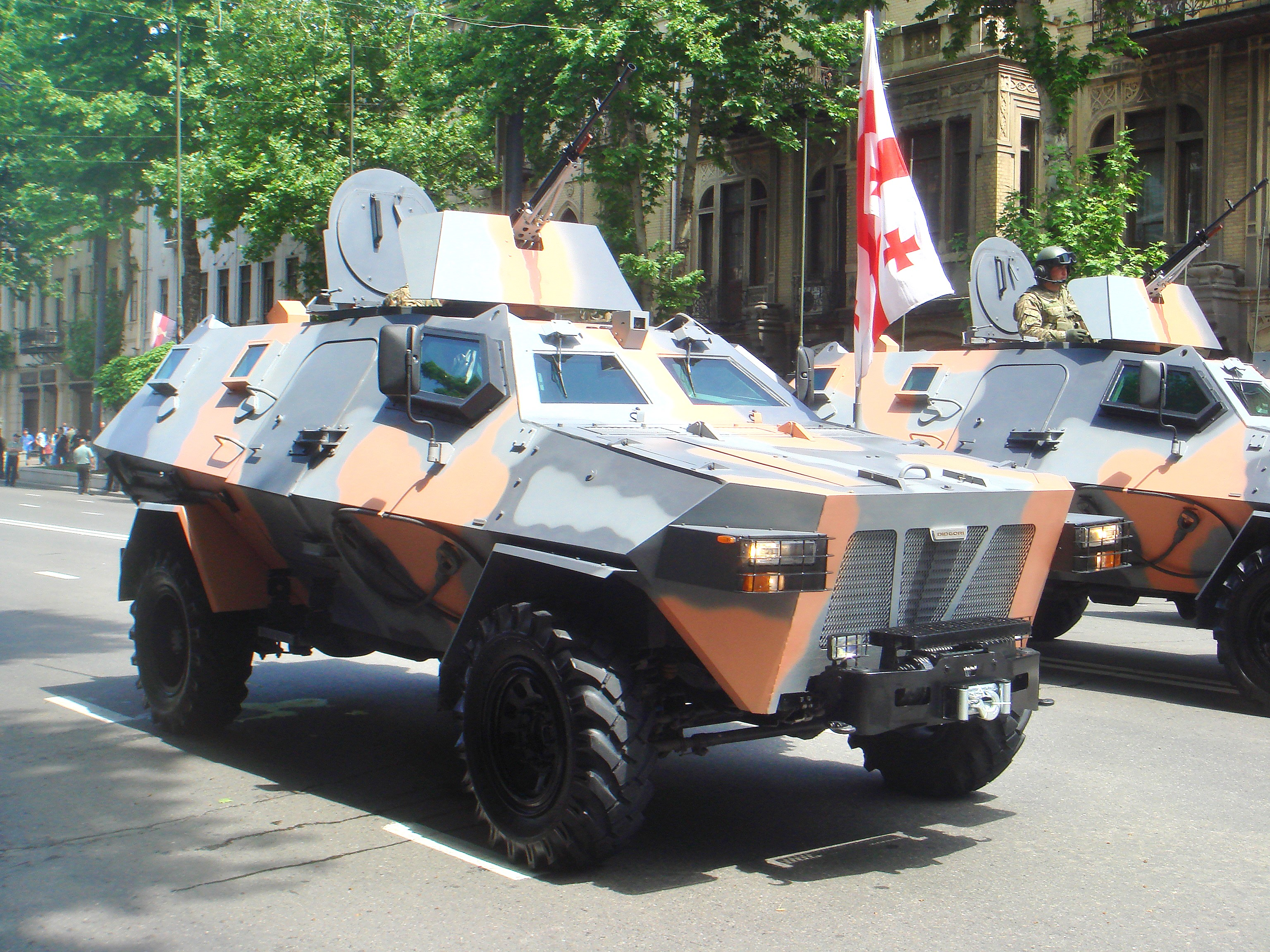
- A Georgian Army Didgori-2 APC in a parade.
- Type: Armoured personnel carrier
- Place of origin: Georgia

Service history
- In service: 2011–Present
- Used by: Operators

Production history
- Designer: Scientific Technical Center Delta
- Manufacturer: Scientific Technical Center Delta

Specifications
- Mass: 8059kg (combat weight 8855 kg)
- Length: 5.75 m
- Width: 2.38 m
- Height: 2.20 m
- Crew: 1+8
- Main armament: 7.62×51mm NATO Minigun or 12.7×108mm NSV machine gun
- Secondary armament: ATGM
- Engine: Double turbo diesel engine 450hp
- Suspension: wheeled 4x4
- Operational range: 500 km
- Maximum speed: 120 km/h

The Didgori-1 (Georgian: დიდგორი) is a Georgian-made armoured personnel carrier developed by the "Delta" research center of the Ministry of Defence and part of the Didgori-series APC family currently constructed in five baseline variants.

== Technical characteristics ==
The vehicle is assembled on and around the chassis of US Ford Super Duty pickup trucks. It is equipped with FLIR Systems thermal and night vision imaging devices provided for front and rear view. Information from the cameras is displayed on monitors for the driver, the commander and the passenger section. The system is interlinked with a special navigation system GPS.

== Armor ==
The armour withstands impacts of 7.62×54mmR AP rounds and 6–8 kg mine blasts at direct contact and from underneath without heavy damage. Further details are unknown, since the composition of the material is classified. The two baseline models are armed with a 7.62×51mm M134 Minigun and the 12.7×108mm NSV machine gun, but can be armed with a wide range of armaments, including ATGMs.

The monocoque steel v-hull provides protection against small arms fire, artillery shell shrapnel, anti-personnel/tank mines and IEDs. Front wheel arches are designed to be blown away to free blast pockets.

== Operators ==
- Georgia – in service of the Defense Forces of Georgia.

== Gallery ==
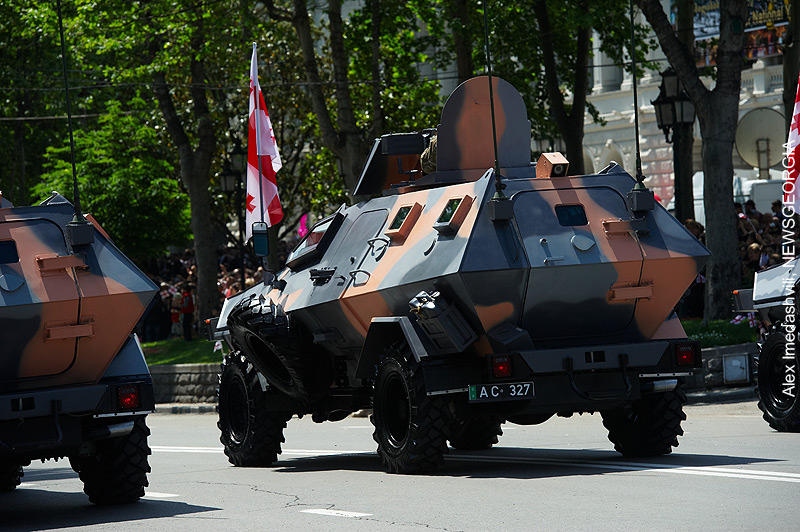

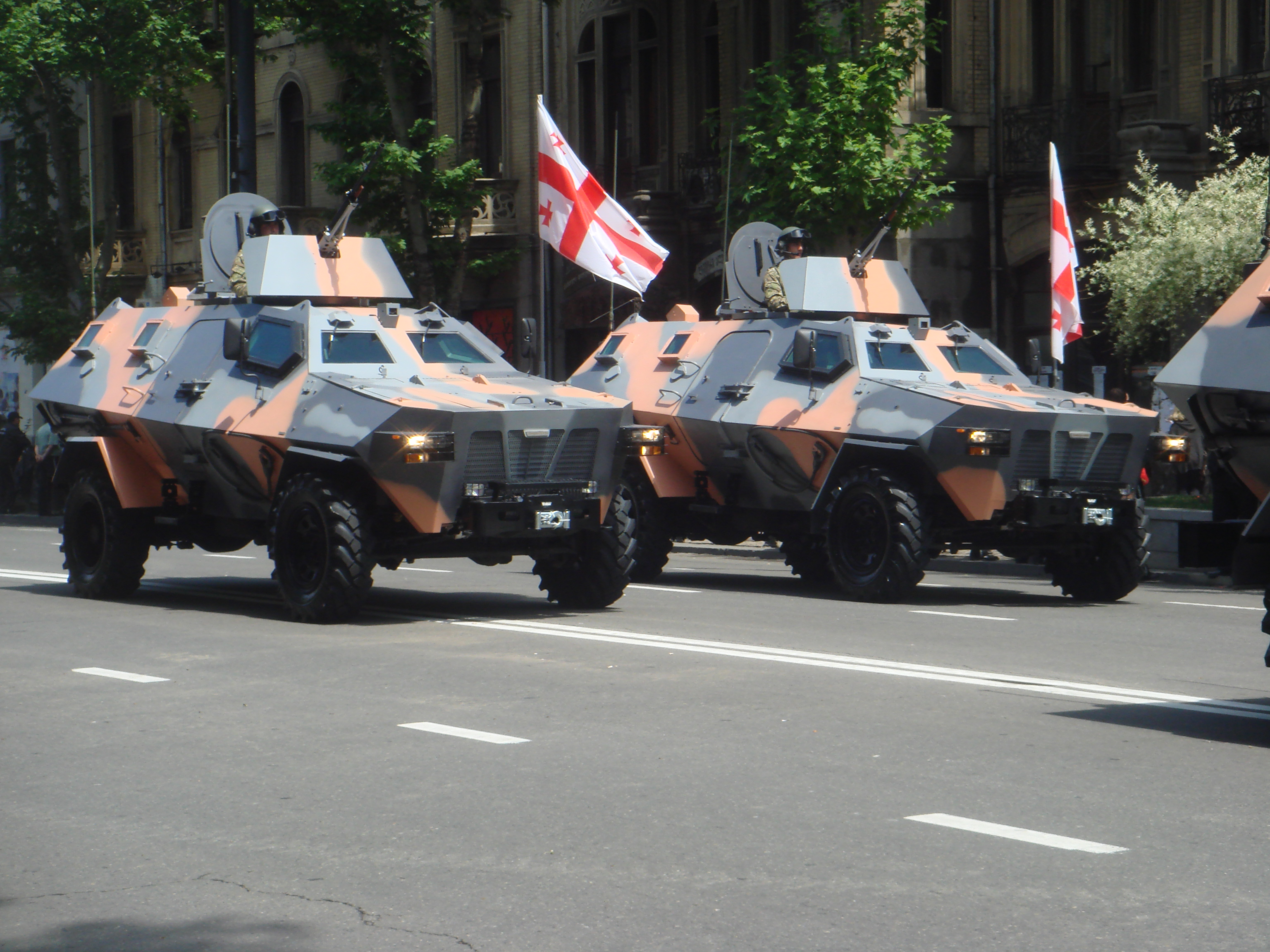

== See also ==
- Didgori-2 – (Georgia)
- Otokar Cobra – (Turkey)
- HMMWV – (United States)
- Oshkosh L-ATV – (United States)
- Lazika – (Georgia)
