= Lazika =

Lazika ლაზიკა
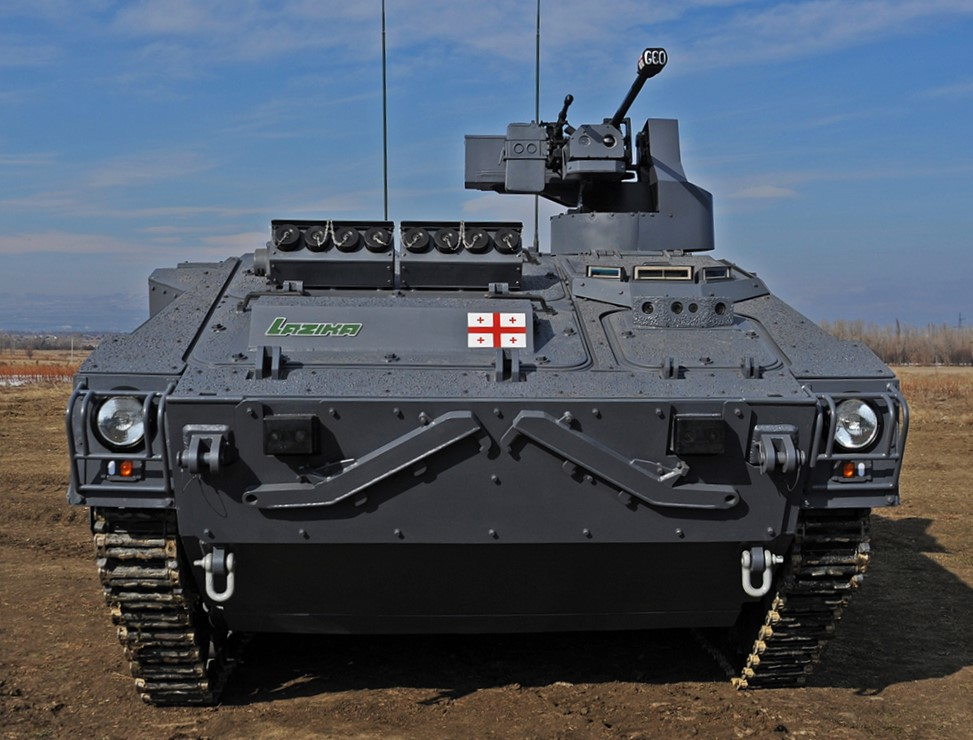
- Type: Infantry fighting vehicle
- Place of origin: Georgia

Service history
- Used by: Georgian Land Forces

Production history
- Designer: Scientific Technical Center Delta
- Designed: 2012
- Manufacturer: Scientific Technical Center Delta

Specifications
- Mass: 14.9 tonnes (16.4 short tons; 14.7 long tons)
- Length: 6.11 metres (20 ft 1 in)
- Width: 3.01 metres (9 ft 11 in)
- Height: 2.92 metres (9 ft 7 in)
- Crew: 3 (driver-mechanic, commander, operator-gunner) + 7 passengers
- Armor: hull front and hull sides STANAG 4569 level 4, hull rear STANAG 4569 level 2-3 uparmored version increases overall resistance in accordance to STANAG 4569 level 5
- Main armament: 23×152mm 2A14 RC; Modular weapon platform MRLS, SAM, ATGM
- Secondary armament: twinned 7.62×54mmR PKT machinegun - RC.
- Engine: V shape diesel engine 6 Cylinder 450 bhp/2200 rpm
- Suspension: individual torsion bar
- Ground clearance: 444 mm
- Fuel capacity: 400 l
- Operational range: 400 km (450 on paved roads)
- Maximum speed: 70 km/h
- Steering system: hydraulic assisted steering

The LAZIKA (Georgian: ლაზიკა) is a proposed Georgian Infantry fighting vehicle, developed by the Scientific Technical Center STC Delta and funded by the Georgian military. One of its main characteristics is the relatively thick armor compared to the vehicle's size. Another feature is the remote weapon station. A number of vehicles has been produced, but the project itself is still under development with various versions including uparmored ones, being taken into consideration.

== Technical characteristics ==
The vehicle is equipped with night-day and thermal imaging cameras attached to the Remote Weapon Station and driver cabin. Electronics include similar to an MBT's friend or foe recognition set, as well as digital controls and satellite connected navigation. It also includes the latest communication systems.

The armored hull of the vehicle is based on a tracked chassis. The layout houses an engine compartment in the front, crew cab in the center and troop compartment at the rear. The power pack is placed at the front of the hull, with the exhaust outlet on the right. The vehicle can accommodate 10 personnel, including three crew plus seven infantrymen. The troop section is provided with individual mine blast seats for passengers. Troops can enter and exit the vehicle through a power-operated ramp at the rear. An emergency door is also provided on the ramp. The combat weight of the vehicle is 14t, which is considered to be much lighter in comparison with other modern IFVs. Primarily designed to transport a squad of infantry and their weapons, Lazika delivers mobility, protection and fire power for the operators. The driver's cabin and remotely controlled weapon station are equipped with day / night and thermal imaging cameras. The observation systems aboard the vehicle can detect and identify multiple targets located at long ranges. Four roof hatches are provided for observation purposes. The fire control system ensures accurate firing in all weather conditions. Other equipment includes friend or foe (IFF), digital controls and satellite linked navigation. The modern communication systems fitted on the vehicle ensure effective communication between troops.

=== Armament ===
The current armament consists of a 23×152mm 2A14 autocannon (100 cartridge) and a twinned 7.62×54mmR PKT machinegun (500 cartridge), which are installed on a remote weapon station. The Lazikas universal fighting module allows the mounting of different types of armament such as MLRS, SAMs and ATGMs. The aiming system consists of combined video thermal chambers integrated into a permanent 27/12V weapon control system.

=== Armour ===
The hull of the vehicle is attached with combined armour against 14.5mm AP rounds to the front and flanks and 7.62mm AP rounds to the rear. Lazika offers STANAG Level IV mine blast protection. The vehicle can withstand 10 kg anti-tank mine blasts underneath and 6 kg mine blasts by direct hull contact.

Lazika is considered to be one of the best protected infantry fighting vehicles in the world, yet having lighter weight than a vehicle of similar types would expose. The armour solution bears similarities with the advanced armour solutions employed by Israeli armoured vehicles but yet remains highly classified. Eight smoke-grenade dischargers mounted on the top of the forward hull improve the survivability of the vehicle. The vehicle can be fitted with NBC protection and automatic fire suppression systems.

=== Engine and mobility ===
The vehicle is powered by a turbocharged diesel engine which is capable of developing a power of 300 hp. The power pack provides a maximum speed of 70 km/h. The vehicle has an operational range of 200 km, which can be increased to 400 km by additional fuel tanks. It is fitted with torsion bar suspension system. The running gear on either side of the vehicle's hull includes five road wheels with the drive sprocket at the front and idler at the rear. The upper part of the suspension is covered by armour plates.

The Lazika delivers superior mobility over difficult terrain and offers better obstacle climbing power and greater manoeuvreability than other tracked IFVs. It can negotiate a 60% gradient and 30% side slopes. The vehicle is capable of crossing vertical steps of 0.7m and trenches of 2m depth as well as standing and driving on 30% lateral deviation and 1.2m deep water pass. Precise weight distribution for excellent stability is provided as well as unprepared water fording capability. The IFVs chassis was tested on various ground conditions and has high power to rate ratio in general.

=== Modules ===
Due to the universal modular design the Lazika can change its role from IFV to APC, command and control unit, ambulance, recovery vehicle, reconnaissance vehicle, mobile SAM, artillery or ATGM system.

== Operators ==
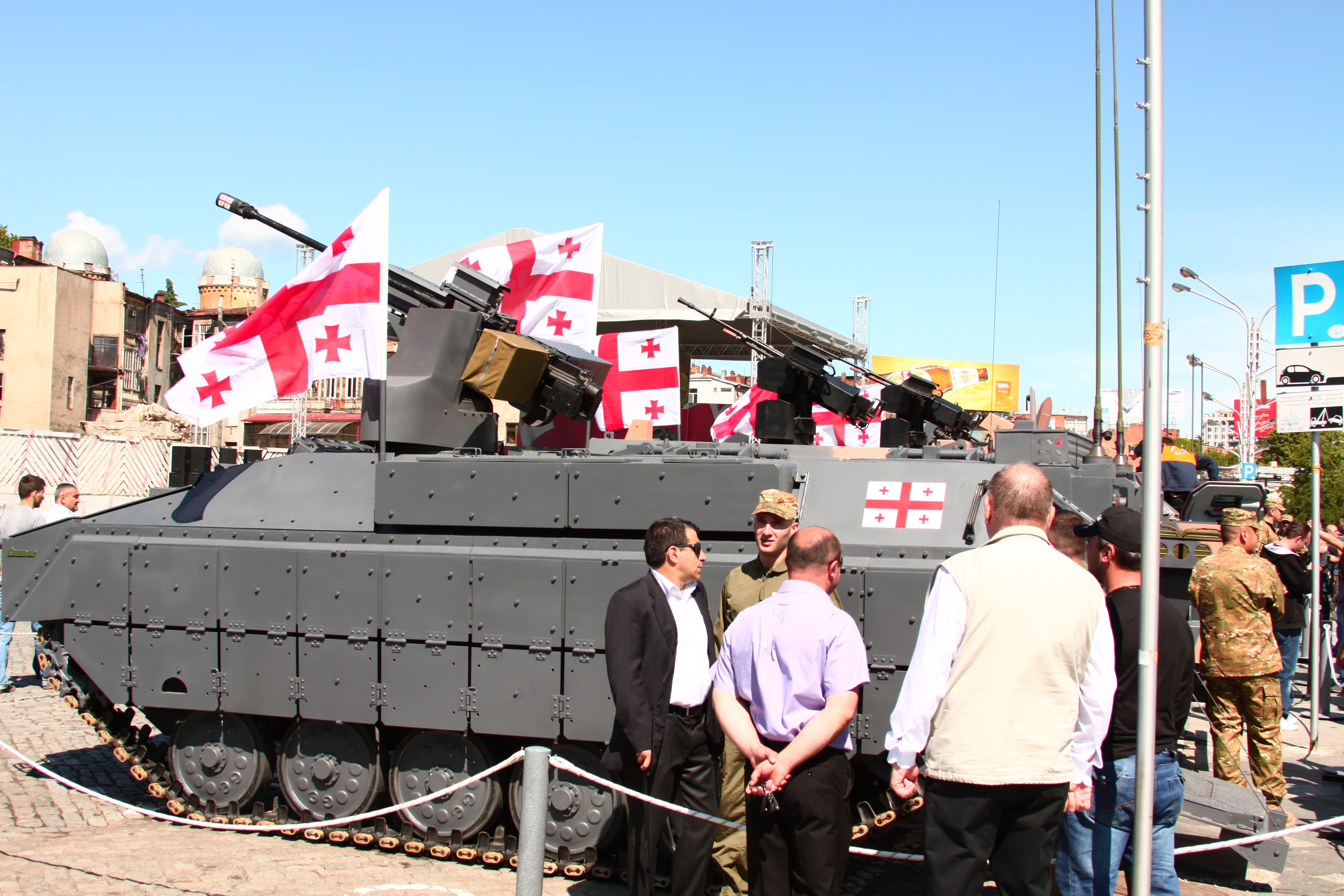
Infantry Fighting Vehicle "Lazika"

- (Georgia (country)) Georgian Armed Forces

== See also ==
- ASCOD – (Spain, Austria)
- BMD-1 – (Soviet Union)
- BMD-2 – (Soviet Union)
- BMP-1 – (Soviet Union)
- BMP-2 – (Soviet Union)
- BMP-3 – (Soviet Union, Russia)
- Dardo IFV – (Italy)
- AMX-10P – (France)
- Marder (IFV) – (West Germany)
- Puma (IFV) – (Germany)
- ZBD-97 – (China)
- Bradley Fighting Vehicle – (United States)
- Warrior IFV – (United Kingdom)
