= DME torch =

Type of torch

A DME torch is a brand of torch made by Astronics DME that can be found on commercial aircraft as part of the aircraft's emergency equipment. It is typically found next to, on, or inside, each flight attendant's jump seat and is for use in an emergency situation where there has been a loss of cabin electrics. It is primarily to be used by flight attendants to ensure that their cabin area is clear of passengers before they leave the aircraft. It also has uses outside the aircraft post-evacuation and also inside the cabin, during flight, if there is a total loss of cabin lighting.

== Description ==
The DME EF-1 torch is beige in colour and is housed in a mounting bracket of the same colour. The body of the torch is ribbed and has a small red LED that flashes to indicate that the torch is charged and serviceable.

The EF-1 generates 1,400 candela has a duration of 4 hours continuous use and can be switched off by replacing it in its stowage or unscrewing the lens cap. Removing the bottom of the body will also preserve the battery. Replacing the torch in the stowage will not, however, charge the battery.
