= MX991/U Flashlight =

Flashlight used by the US Army and Marines

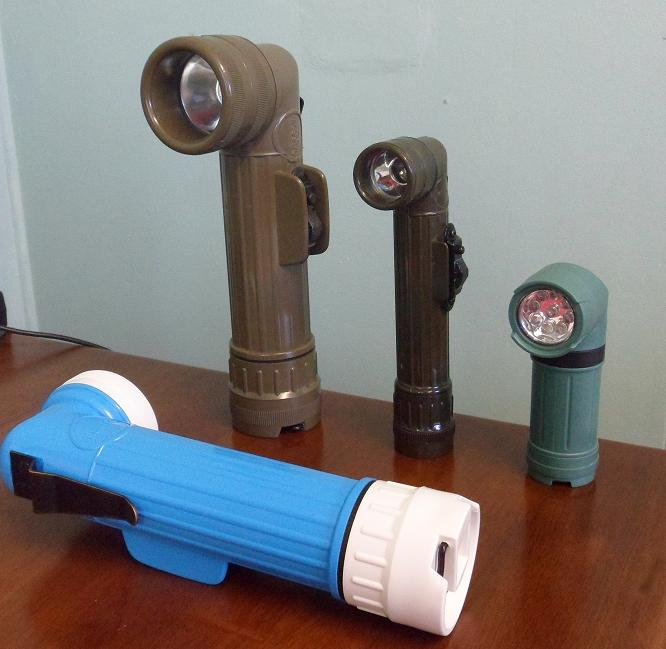
A photograph showing two Fulton MX-991/U Flashlights, next to an unofficial reproduction and a standard angle-head flashlight.

The MX-991/U flashlight (aka GI flashlight, Army flashlight, or Moonbeam) is an angle-head flashlight used by the United States military since the Vietnam War. A development of the World War II-era TL-122 flashlight series, the MX-991/U flashlight is currently produced by Fulton Industries and issued to the United States Army and United States Marines.

== Design ==
Just prior to World War II, a standard 90-degree battery-operated flashlight was adopted for the U.S. Army with the designation TL-122. The TL-122 was itself a slightly altered version of the angle-head, brass-bodied Eveready Model No. 2694 Industrial flashlight and the No. 2697 Boy Scout flashlight, first introduced in 1927.

The TL-122 used the same case as the Eveready No. 2697 with the “TL-122” designation stamped into the head instead of the BSA emblem. The flashlight body was painted Army olive drab and the lens, switch and battery caps were finished in black, but the TL-122 used the same #14 screw-base bulb as the BSA flashlight.

== Modifications ==
Original MX-991/U flashlights can also accept custom LED lamp of the proper voltage, which greatly extend the battery life and provide brighter light than the standard PR krypton incandescent bulb. Other improvements include battery adaptors to accept modern lithium-ion batteries such as the 18650 battery, custom glass lenses and new reflector designs to improve light throw.

== Variants ==
The TL-122 in its various forms was manufactured by various U.S., Italian, and British contractors for the US, British, Italian (post-WWII), and French armies. Four versions of the TL-122 were eventually developed, all utilizing exposed slider-type light switches (no switch guard): During the 1950s, French armed forces (Forces Armées Françaises) issued its own version of the TL-122(D) supplied by a French contractor.

=== TL-122 ===
Original model with #14 screw-base bulb based on the Eveready Model No. 2697. Manufacturer's name (Eveready, Niagara) stamped on base of housing.

=== TL-122-A ===
Introduced in 1939. Like the TL-122, the TL-122(A) used a housing made out of stamped brass (later changed to plastic after brass became a strategic material in the United States during WWII). Manufacturer's name (Eveready, Niagara, USALite) stamped into base of housing. Olive drab painted housing with blackened metal screw caps over the lens and the base. Featuring improved waterproofing and a brighter PR-9 flange base bulb, the TL-122A entered service in 1939, and was designed to fit armored vehicle flashlight brackets.

=== TL-122-B ===
First plastic (Bakelite) flashlight, issued September 1943, OD color. Manufacturer's name (Bright Star, Eveready, USALite, GITS, Micro-Lite) stamped on base of housing.

=== TL-122-C ===
Improved plastic, moisture-proof design featuring a sealed lens, battery cap and switch for near waterproof capability. Issued April 1944. Manufacturer's name (Bright Star, GITS, USA LITE) stamped on base of housing.

=== TL-122-D ===
Extended base containing lens filters in blue/red/clear plus spare bulb. Issued late in 1944. Manufacturer's name (Niagara, Ray-O-Vac, USALite, G.E.C.) stamped on base of housing. The TL-122-D used a copper battery spring.

=== MX-99/U ===
Approved as to design in 1960, the MX-99/U was assigned the NSN stock number NSN 6230-00-264-8261 in January 1961. Service deployment commenced in quantity in 1963. First manufactured by GT Price, the MX99/U is a further development of the 1944 TL-122(D). The new flashlight used a plastic housing incorporating a second lens ring with an extended base containing lens filters in blue, red, and clear, plus a spare bulb.

Like the TL-122, the MX-99/U utilizes two D-cell batteries (military BA-30), a standard PR type incandescent bulb, a belt/equipment clip, a tailcap lanyard ring, a multi-mode on/off/momentary (signaling) switch, and a tailcap with a storage compartment housing a spare bulb and multiple colored plastic lenses for signaling purposes.

Changes to the MX-99/U flashlight over the TL-122(D) include an improved, high-impact plastic housing, a plated steel battery spring, improved gasketing (the "U" designation stands for "Underwater"), and a lens reflector deeply into the lens shroud (to reduce light spillover).

=== MX-991/U ===
During the Vietnam era, an improved model was introduced, the MX-991/U. This flashlight used the nomenclature "FLASHLIGHT: Electric, Portable and Hand Lighting Equipment, 2-cell, w/ lamp and lens filter, w/o batteries, Type I Class A (21108) MX991-U" retaining the identical NSN 6230-00-264-8261.

There are some differences in markings among the various contractors for the MX-991/U. Most Fulton and GT Price-produced units bear the stamp "U.S." above the model number, while this marking is sometimes absent on flashlights produced by USALite and Bright Star.

In 1973, a change was made to the design using a switchguard to prevent accidental engagement of the on-off switch, and this modification was incorporated on MX-991/U flashlights produced since 1975.

The housing and screw-on components of the current MX-991/U flashlight are constructed from heat and corrosion resistant polypropylene and ABS plastic. The multi-mode switch on the military-specification MX-991/U is riveted to the plastic battery housing and is constructed of black-oxide brass.

The switch features three settings: Off, Signal, and On. When the switch is set to Signal, the user is able to press and hold a button located just above the switch for momentary operation of the PR6 bulb. This allows users to signal using Morse code.

When the switch is moved up to the On position, the flashlight remains on without any further user interaction. During heavy usage in the rainy season in Southeast Asia it was found that the flashlight's on-off switch could be moved into the 'on' position (thus draining the batteries) through contact with the soldier's personal equipment.

Since 1973, MX-991/U flashlights have incorporated a switch guard to prevent accidental operation of the flashlight.

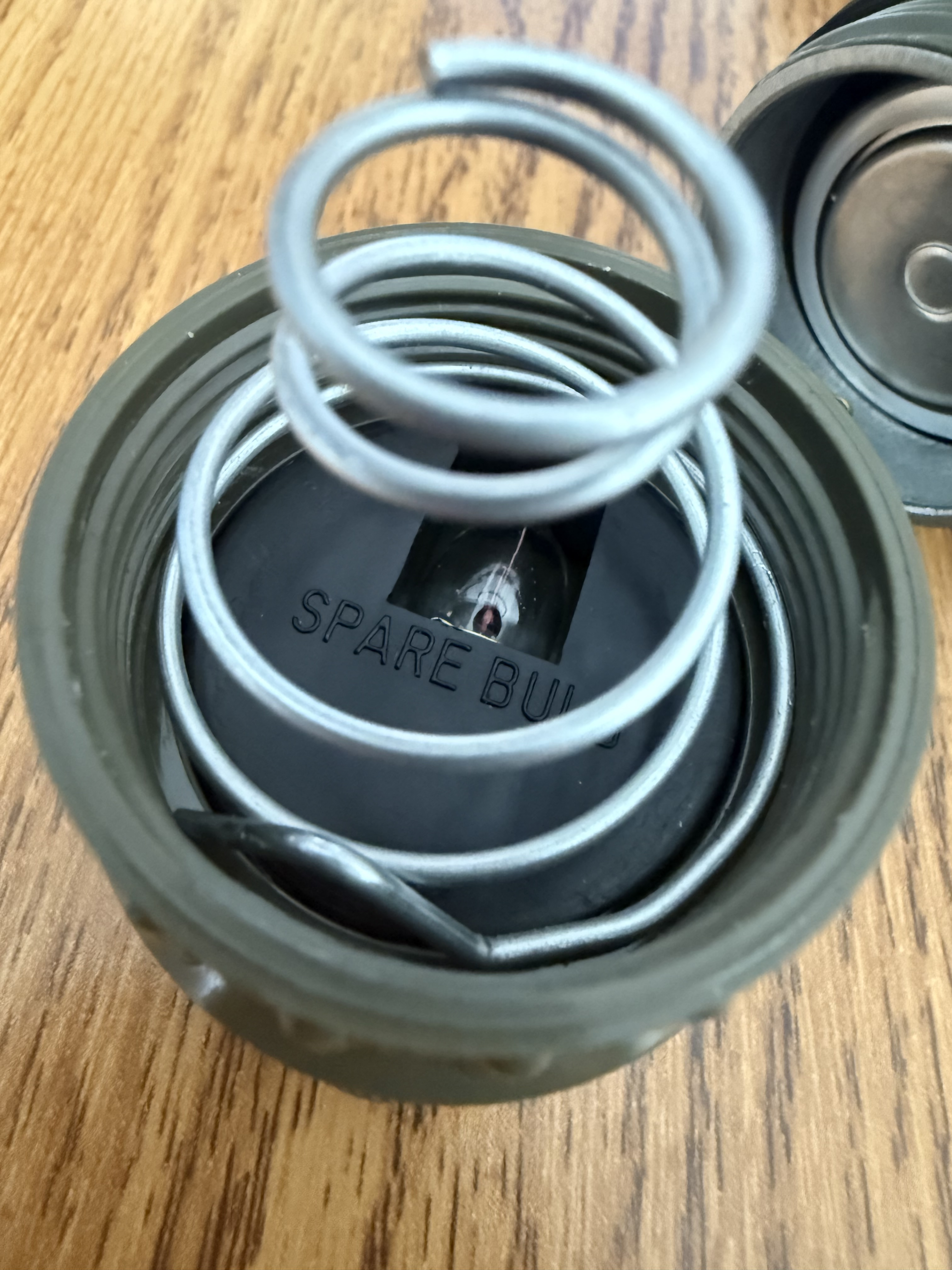
A spare PR6 bulb in the base of a Fulton MX-991\U. The battery spring can be removed to access it.

The tailcap consists of two compartments. The first houses the stainless steel spring that retains the 2 'D' cell batteries inside the flashlight body. Under the spring, a small plastic component houses a spare PR6 incandescent flashlight bulb. The second part of the tailcap consists of a small compartment that houses five plastic accessory lenses.

The nosecap of the flashlight has an additional retainer ring that may be unscrewed, allowing a custom lens to be fitted. The flashlight contains five lenses in the tailcap, consisting of two red lenses, a blue lens, a white lens, and a diffuser lens (earlier models utilized three red lenses and omitted the blue and green lenses). This feature enables soldiers to send color-coded signals or to preserve night vision. As the flashlight's focus is non-adjustable, the accessory diffuser lens is intended to spread the light in a wide pattern instead of the standard spot beam.

Fulton currently manufactures the flashlight in varying color combinations, often to designate a special use or model. Most of these variants are available to the civilian market through Fulton or retail sources:

- Olive Drab (military, US Army or US Marines)
- ACU Digital Camouflage (US Army)
- Yellow tailcap and nosecap with a black body (Industrial, explosion-proof)
- White tailcap and nosecap with a teal body (Telecommunications)
- Grey (military, US Air Force, US Navy, US Coast Guard)
- Black (law enforcement use, military subcontract)
- Khaki/tan (military, US Army, US Navy, or US Marines)
- Woodland Camo (military, US Army, US Navy, or US Marines)

== Copies ==
The MX-991/U has been widely copied over the years by numerous companies and nations including China (PRC), France, Great Britain, Italy, and Taiwan.

A postwar version of the TL-122-B (with the temporary use button under the switch) and TL-122-D flashlight (without switch guard) was produced in quantity for the French Army (marked Fr for "FRANCE" with 2 small crossed flags featuring the letter T for Transmission) and remained in service until approximately 1990. Both used a switch attached with screws instead of the original's riveted design.

Flashlights bearing the name TL-122 (but incorporating the modern deep-set lens and switchguard absent from the WWII original) have been produced in large numbers by manufacturers for the civilian market in recent years, along with no-name Asian-manufactured copies that utilize 'AA', 'C', and 'D' cells. Many of these copies use Phillips-head screws instead of rivets to attach the light switch to the battery housing.

While similar flashlights are often sold online, at military PX stores or surplus dealers, Fulton Industries is the only current U.S. military contractor for the MX-991/U and all GI-issue flashlights are currently marked "Fulton" and "MX-991/U".
