= Olight =

Chinese flashlight brand

- Industry: Illumination Tools
- Founded: 2007; 19 years ago
- Founder: Fox Fan
- Headquarters: Zhongshan, China
- Products: flashlights; weapon-mounted lights; headlamps; electric lanterns
- Website: olight.com

Olight is a flashlight manufacturer that was founded in 2007 by Fox Fan. The brand is headquartered in Zhongshan, China, and maintains operations in Georgia, United States.

Olight specializes in the production of flashlights, including LED flashlights, survival lights, and tactical flashlights. In addition, it also produces headlamps, batteries, and lanterns.

The company provides lighting tools for a variety of users, including law enforcement personnel, military professionals, and outdoor enthusiasts.

== History ==
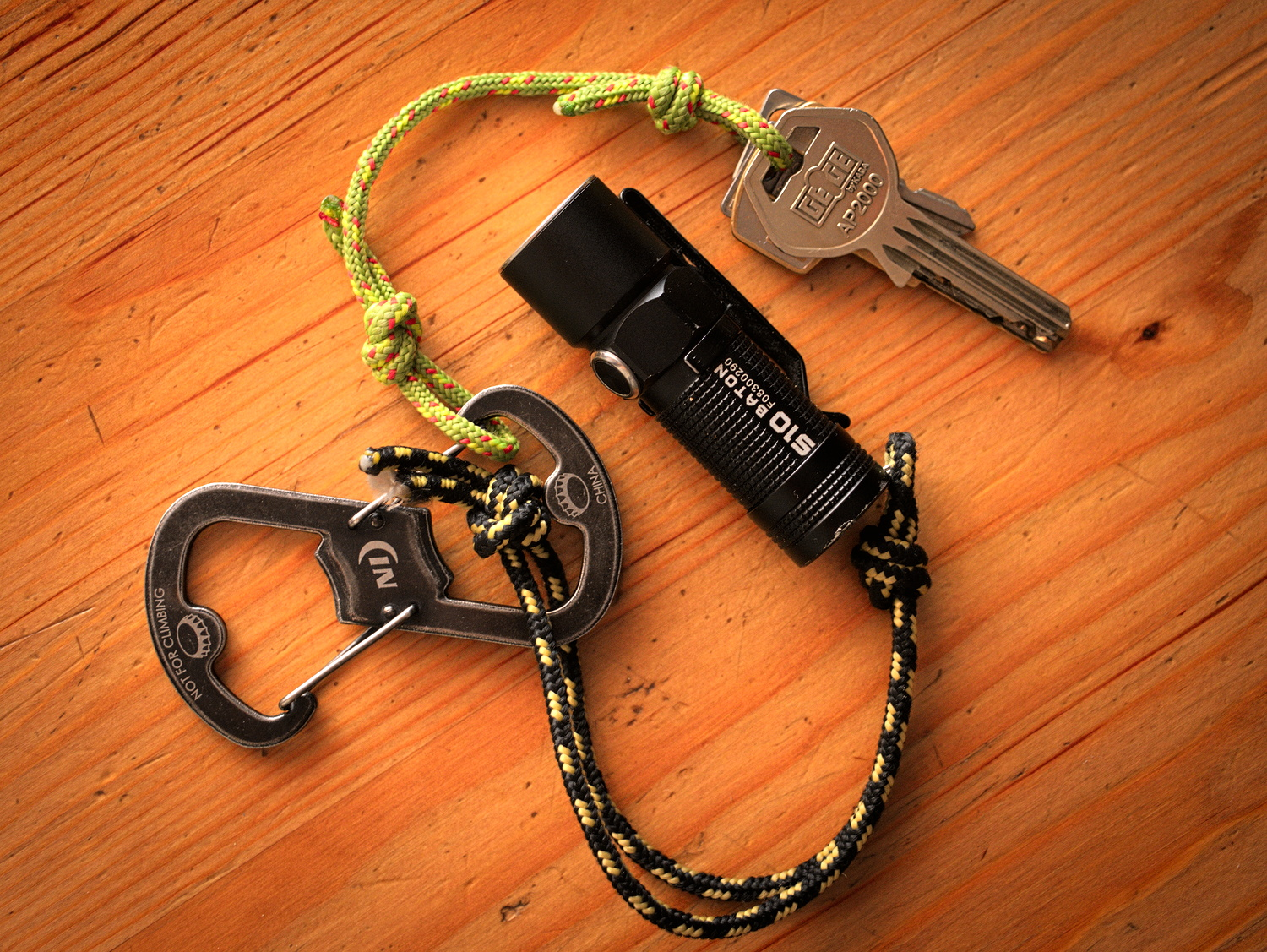
An Olight S10 Baton flashlight on a keychain.

Olight, which was established by Fox Fan in Shenzhen in 2007, currently focuses on flashlights that can be rechargeable.

In 2014, it launched a new product with a light range of 810 meters, and then a torch with a magnet function.

In 2015, the brand rolled out the S2 Baton, which is small in size but high in brightness, with a total internal reflection (TIR) lens and a magnetized bottom.

In 2018, Olight launched a tactical flashlight called "WARRIOR X".

In 2022, Olight launched the Arkfeld EDC flashlight.

In 2024, Olight launched the Arkfeld Ultra.

In 2025, Olight launched the Ostation X 3-in-1 Smart Battery Charger. The product was recognized with a CES Innovation Award for its design and functionality.

In 2025, Olight launched the ArkPro product line.

== Criticism and controversies ==
In November 2017, a man was killed by an Olight flashlight that exploded due to improper use after placing it in his mouth. The lawsuit alleged negligence by Olight and was terminated in November 2023, without public records detailing the precise outcome.

In March 2022, Olight recalled 215,000 flashlights. Some of these products caused burns after they were accidentally turned on, including three instances of second-degree burns. The recall notice from the U.S. Consumer Product Safety Commission (CPSC) stated that "the flashlights can be turned on inadvertently and overheat while stored in the holster or a consumer's pocket, posing a burn hazard to consumers."
