= Flashlight =

Portable hand-held electric light

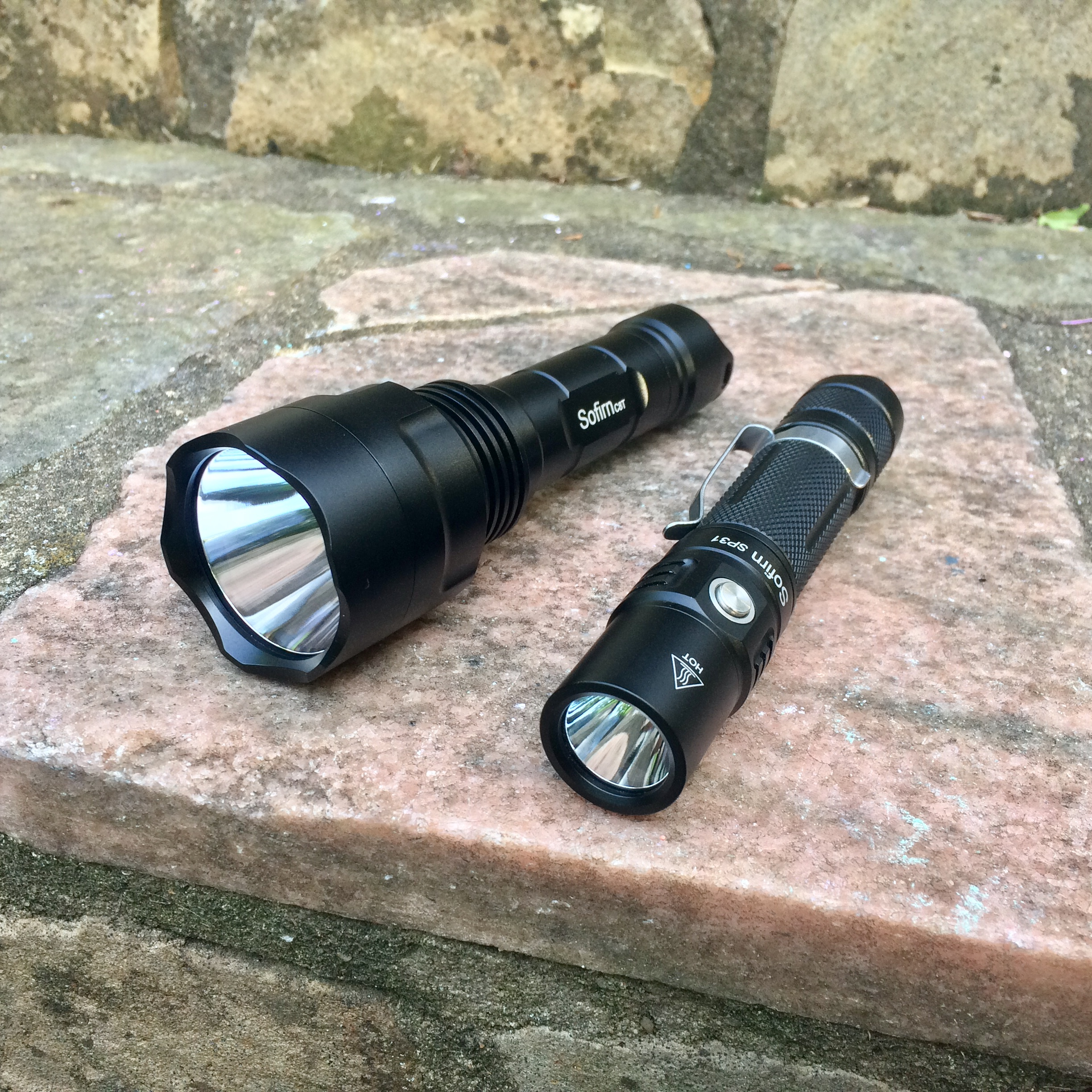
A set of modern LED flashlights

A flashlight (American English) or electric torch (Commonwealth English), usually shortened to torch, is a portable hand-held electric lamp. Formerly, the light source typically was a miniature incandescent light bulb, but these have been displaced by light-emitting diodes (LEDs) since the early 2000s. A typical flashlight consists of the light source mounted in a reflector, a transparent cover (sometimes combined with a lens) to protect the light source and reflector, a battery, and a switch, all enclosed in a case.

The invention of the dry cell and miniature incandescent electric lamps made the first battery-powered flashlights possible around 1899. Today, flashlights use mostly light-emitting diodes and run on disposable or rechargeable batteries. Some are powered by the user turning a crank, shaking the lamp, or squeezing it. Some have solar panels to recharge the battery. Flashlights are used as a light source outdoors, in places without permanently installed lighting, during power outages, or when a portable light source is needed.

In addition to the general-mass , hand-held flashlight, many forms have been adapted for special uses. Head- or helmet-mounted flashlights designed for miners and campers leave both hands free. Some flashlights can be used under water or in flammable atmospheres.

== Etymology ==
Early flashlights ran on zinc–carbon batteries, which could not provide a steady electric current and required periodic "rest" to continue functioning. Because these early flashlights also used energy-inefficient carbon-filament bulbs, "resting" occurred at short intervals. Consequently, they could be used only in brief flashes, hence the common North American name "flashlight".

== History ==
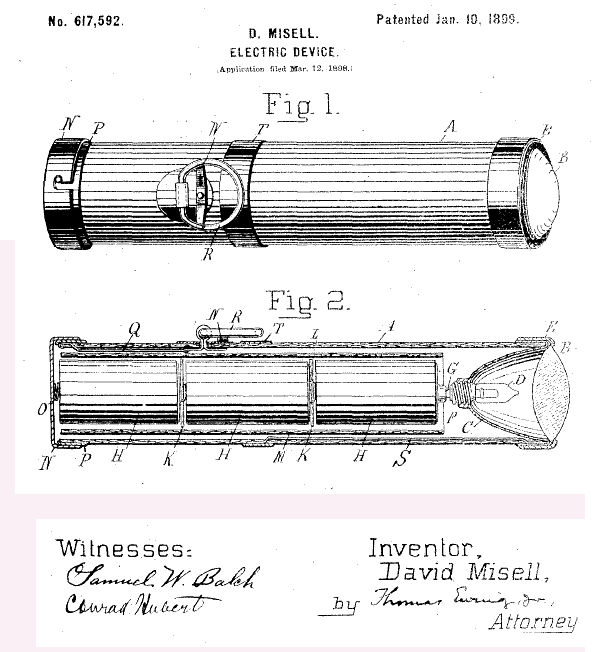
Misell's Patent 617,592 line drawings show cross section of flashlight with three cells, reflector, and lens

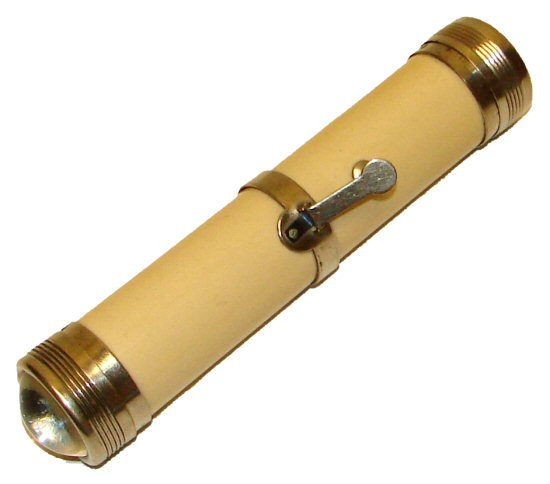
The 1899 flashlight was a fiber tube with brass end caps and bulls-eye glass lens at one end.

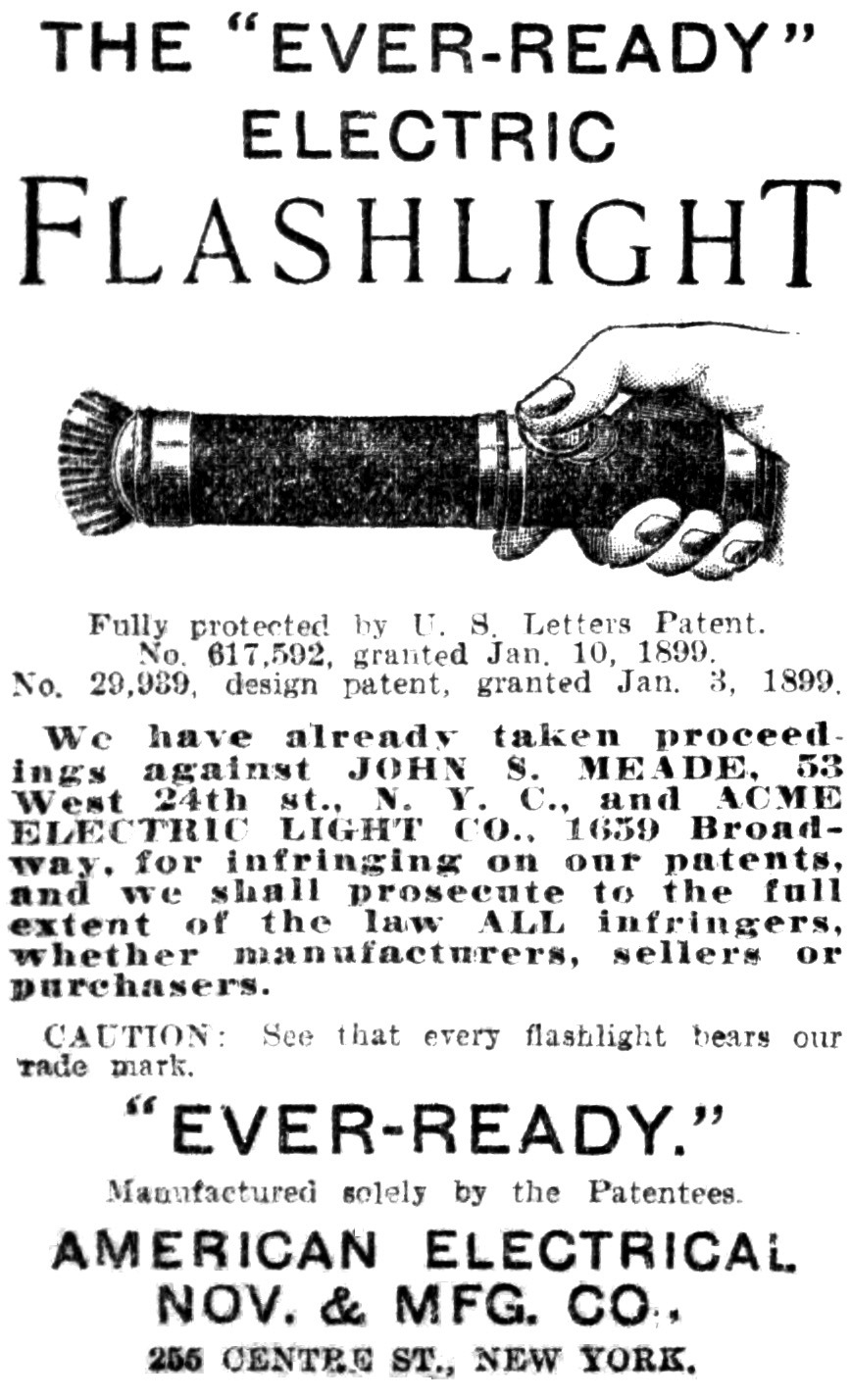
January 1899 Ever-Ready flashlight ad mentioning the proceedings against the alleged patent-infringing rival companies

The first dry cell battery was invented in 1887. Unlike previous batteries, it used a paste electrolyte instead of a liquid. This was the first battery suitable for portable electrical devices, as it did not spill or break easily and worked in any orientation. The first mass-produced dry cell batteries came in 1896, and the invention of portable electric lights soon followed. Portable hand-held electric lights offered advantages in convenience and safety over (combustion) torches, candles and lanterns. The electric lamp was odorless, smokeless, and emitted less heat than combustion-powered lighting. It could be instantly turned on and off, and avoided fire risk.

On January 10, 1899, British inventor David Misell obtained U.S. Patent No. 617,592, assigned to American Electrical Novelty and Manufacturing Company. This "electric device" designed by Misell was powered by "D" batteries laid front to back in a paper tube with the light bulb and a rough brass reflector at the end. The company donated some of these devices to the New York City police, who responded favorably to them.

Carbon-filament bulbs and fairly crude dry cells made early flashlights an expensive novelty, with low sales and low manufacturer interest. Development of the tungsten-filament lamp in 1904, with three times the efficacy of carbon filament types, along with improved batteries in varying sizes made flashlights more useful and popular. The advantage of instant control, and the absence of flame, meant that hand-held electric lights began to replace combustion-based lamps such as the hurricane lantern.

By 1907, several types of flashlights were available: the tubular hand-held variety, a lantern style that could be set down for extended use, pocket-size penlights for close work, and large reflector searchlight-type lamps for lighting distant objects. In 1922 there were an estimated 10 million flashlight users in the United States, with annual sales of renewal batteries and flashlights at $20 million, comparable to sales of many line-operated electrical appliances. Flashlights became very popular in China; by the end of the 1930s, 60 companies made flashlights, some selling for as little as one-third the cost of equivalent imported models. Miniature lamps developed for flashlight and automotive uses became an important sector of the incandescent lamp manufacturing business.

LED flashlights were introduced in the early 2000s. Maglite made their first LED flashlight in 2006.

== Incandescent ==
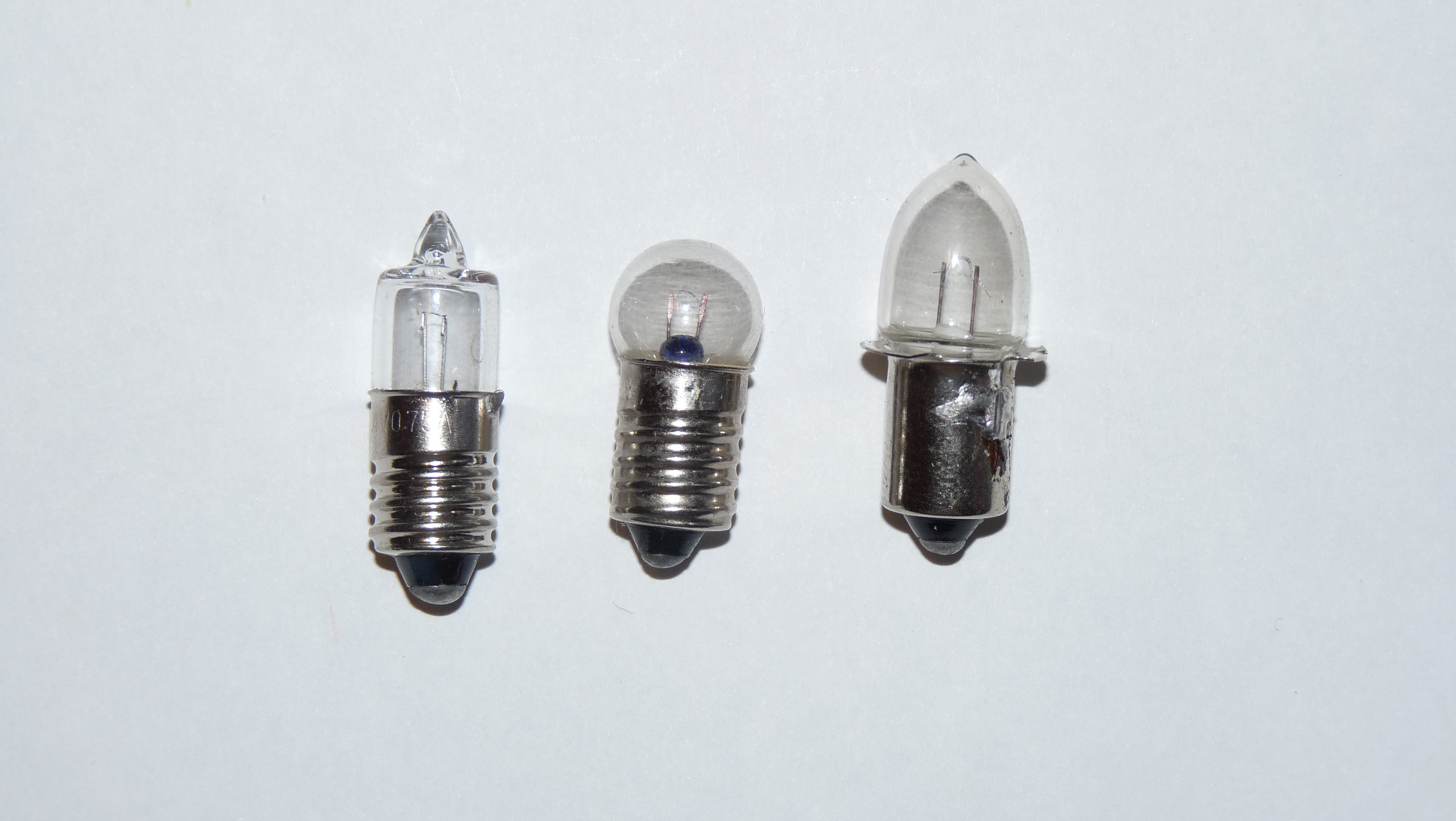
Miniature incandescent bulbs for use in flashlights: The tungsten filament bulb was essential to turn the flashlight from a novelty to a useful tool.

Incandescent flashlights use incandescent light bulbs, which consist of a glass bulb and a tungsten filament. The bulbs are under vacuum or filled with argon, krypton, or xenon. Some high-power incandescent flashlights use a halogen lamp where the bulb contains a halogen gas such as iodine or bromine to improve the life and efficacy of the bulb. In all but disposable or novelty flashlights, the bulb is user-replaceable; the bulb life may be only a few hours.

The light output of an incandescent lamp in a flashlight varies widely depending on the type of lamp. A miniature keychain lamp produces one or two lumens . A two-D-cell flashlight using a common prefocus-style miniature lamp produces on the order of 15 to 20 lumens of light and a beam of about 200 candlepower. One popular make of rechargeable focusing flashlight uses a halogen lamp and produces 218 lumens. By comparison, a 60-watt household incandescent lamp will produce about 900 lumens. The luminous efficacy or lumens produced per watt of input of flashlight bulbs varies over the approximate range of 8 to 22 lumens/watt, depending on the size of the bulb and the fill gas, with halogen-filled 12-volt lamps having the highest efficiency.

== LED ==
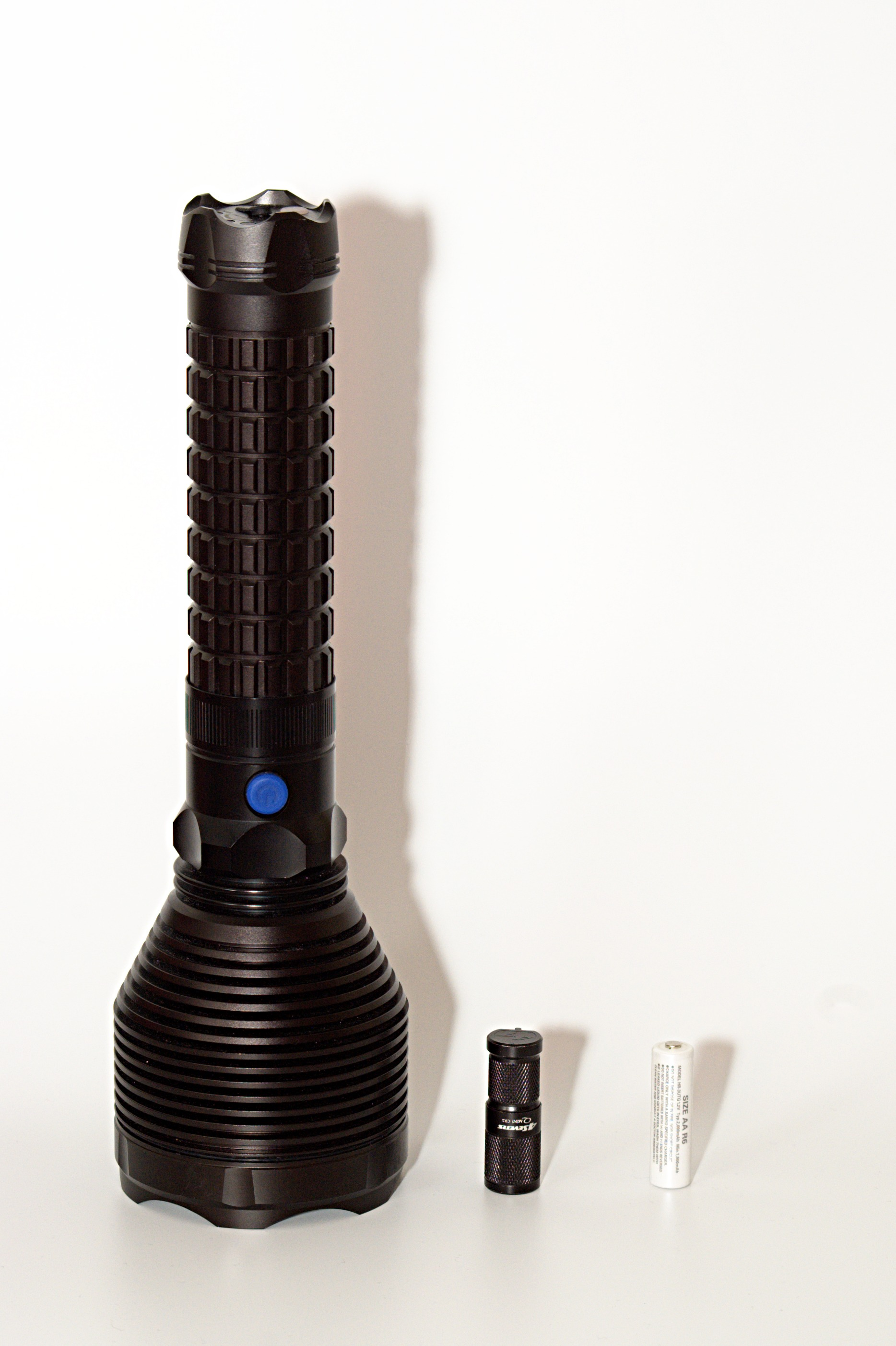
Two LED flashlight extremes: Olight SR90, 2,200 lumens (left), Foursevens Mini MLR2, 180 lumens (middle), AA battery for size comparison (right)

Powerful white-light-emitting diodes (LEDs) have mostly replaced incandescent bulbs in practical flashlights. LEDs existed for decades, mainly as low-power indicator lights. In 1999, Lumileds Corporation of San Jose, California, introduced the Luxeon LED, a high-power white-light emitter. This made possible LED flashlights with lower power consumption and running time better than incandescent flashlights with similar light output. The first Luxeon LED flashlight was the Arc LS, designed in 2001.

White LEDs in 5 mm diameter packages produce only a few lumens each; many units may be grouped together to provide additional light. Higher-power LEDs, drawing more than 100 milliamperes each, simplify the optical design problem of producing a powerful and tightly controlled beam. A chip on board (COB) LED may be used, with multiple LED devices on a heat-dissipating substrate covered by a common layer of phosphor to generate white light. LEDs can be significantly more efficient than incandescent lamps, with white LEDs producing on the order of 100 lumens for every watt, compared to 8-10 lumens per watt of small incandescent bulbs. An LED flashlight has a longer battery life than an incandescent flashlight with comparable output. LEDs are also less fragile than glass lamps. LED lamps have different spectra of light compared to incandescent sources, and are made in several ranges of color temperature and color rendering index. Since the LED has a long life compared to the usual life of a flashlight, very often it is permanently installed. Flashlights made for an incandescent lamp can often be upgraded to a more efficient LED lamp.

LEDs generally must have some kind of control to limit current through the diode. Flashlights using one or two disposable 1.5-volt cells require a boost converter to provide the higher voltage required by a white LED, which needs around 3.4 volts to function. Flashlights using three or more dry cells may only use a resistor to limit current. Some flashlights electronically regulate the current through the LEDs to stabilize light output as the batteries discharge. LEDs maintain nearly constant color temperature regardless of input voltage or current, while the color temperature of an incandescent bulb rapidly declines as the battery discharges, becoming redder and less visible. Regulated LED flashlights may also have user-selectable levels of output appropriate to a task, for example, low light for reading a map and high output for checking a road sign. This would be difficult to do with a single incandescent bulb since efficacy of the lamp drops rapidly at low output.

LED flashlights may consume 1 watt or much more from the battery, producing heat as well as light. In contrast to tungsten filaments, which must be hot to produce light, both the light output and the life of an LED decrease with temperature. Heat dissipation for the LED often dictates that small, high-power LED flashlights have aluminium or other high heat-conductivity bodies, reflectors, and other parts to dissipate heat; they can become warm during use.

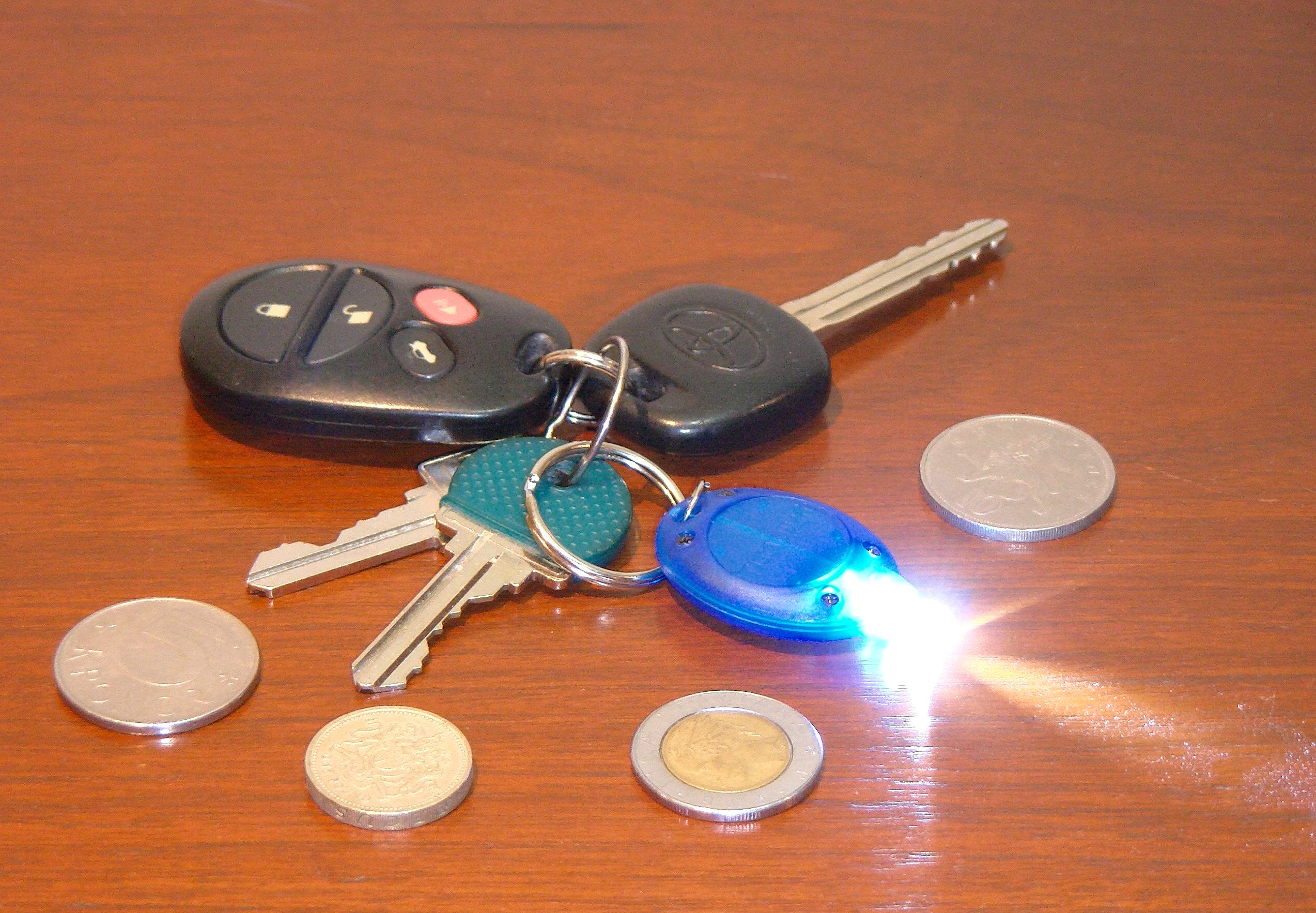
Miniature LED flashlight on a key chain, powered by lithium primary coin batteries

Light output from LED flashlights varies even more widely than for incandescent lights. "Keychain" type lamps operating on button batteries, or lights using a single 5 mm LED, may only produce a few lumens. Even a small LED flashlight operating on an AA cell, but equipped with an LED, can emit 100 lumens.

LEDs are highly efficient at producing colored light compared with incandescent lamps and filters. An LED flashlight may contain different LEDs for white and colored light, selectable by the user for different purposes. Colored LED flashlights are used for signalling, special inspection tasks, forensic examination, or to track the blood trail of wounded game animals. A flashlight may have a red LED intended to preserve dark adaptation of vision. Ultraviolet LEDs may be used for inspection lights, for example, detecting fluorescent dyes added to air conditioning systems to detect leakage, examining paper currency, or checking UV-fluorescing marks on laundry or event ticket holders. Infrared LEDs can be used for illuminators for night-vision systems. LED flashlights may be specified to be compatible with night vision devices.

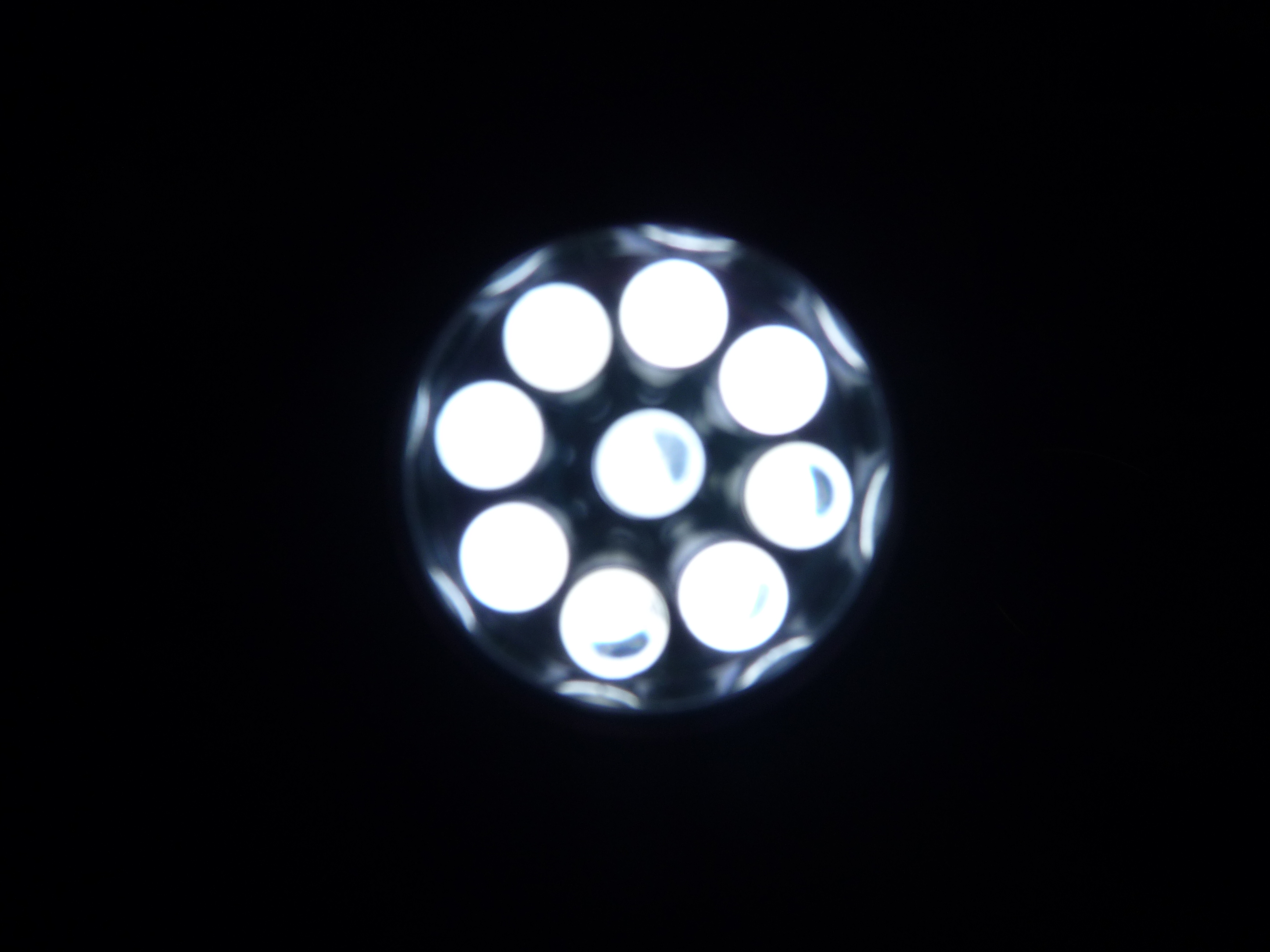
Multiple 5 mm LEDs may be used in small flashlights.

== HID ==
A less common type of flashlight uses a high-intensity discharge lamp (HID lamp) as the light source. An HID gas discharge lamp uses a mixture of metal halide salts and noble gas as a filler. HID lamps produce more light than a traditional incandescent flashlight using the same amount of electricity, though not as much as high power LEDs. The lamp lasts longer and is more shock resistant than a regular incandescent bulb, since it lacks the relatively fragile electrical filament found in incandescent bulbs. However, they are much more expensive than incandescent, due to the ballast circuit required to start and operate the lamp. An HID lamp requires a short warm-up time before it reaches full output.

== LEP ==
LEP stands for Laser Excited Phosphor. The light source is a blue laser diode, which is directed at a phosphor layer to make white light. With the first LEP flashlight available in 2018, there are currently a few dozen LEP flashlights, mainly from China. At the moment, there are 2 types of LEP modules used. The laser light either shines through the phosphor layer to produce white light, or is directed at the layer by a mirror. The mirror-type is built inside a plastic module, while the shine-through models are usually built with a copper/aluminum shell, and much smaller than the plastic type.

== Accessories ==
Accessories for a flashlight allow the color of the light to be altered or allow light to be dispersed differently. Translucent colored plastic cones slipped over the lens of a flashlight increase the visibility when looking at the side of the light. Such marshalling wands are frequently used for directing automobiles or aircraft at night. Colored lenses placed over the end of the flashlight are used for signalling, for example, in railway yards. Colored light is occasionally useful for hunters tracking wounded game after dusk, or for forensic examination of an area. A red filter helps preserve night vision after the flashlight is turned off, and can be useful to observe animals (such as nesting loggerhead sea turtles) without disturbing them.

Detachable light guides, consisting of rigid, bent plastic rods or semi rigid or flexible tubes containing optical fibers, are available for some flashlights for inspection inside tanks, or within walls or structures; when not required, the light guide can be removed and the light used for other purposes.

== Formats and specialized designs ==
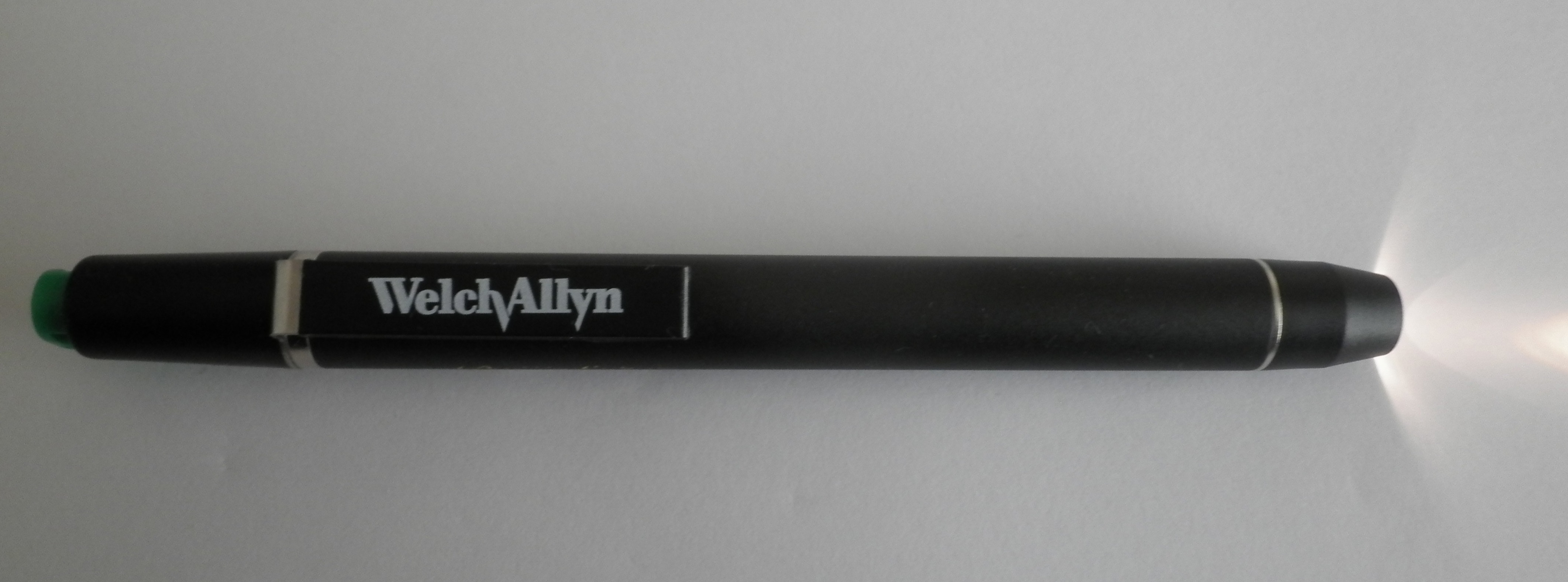
A medical halogen penlight to observe pupillary light reflex

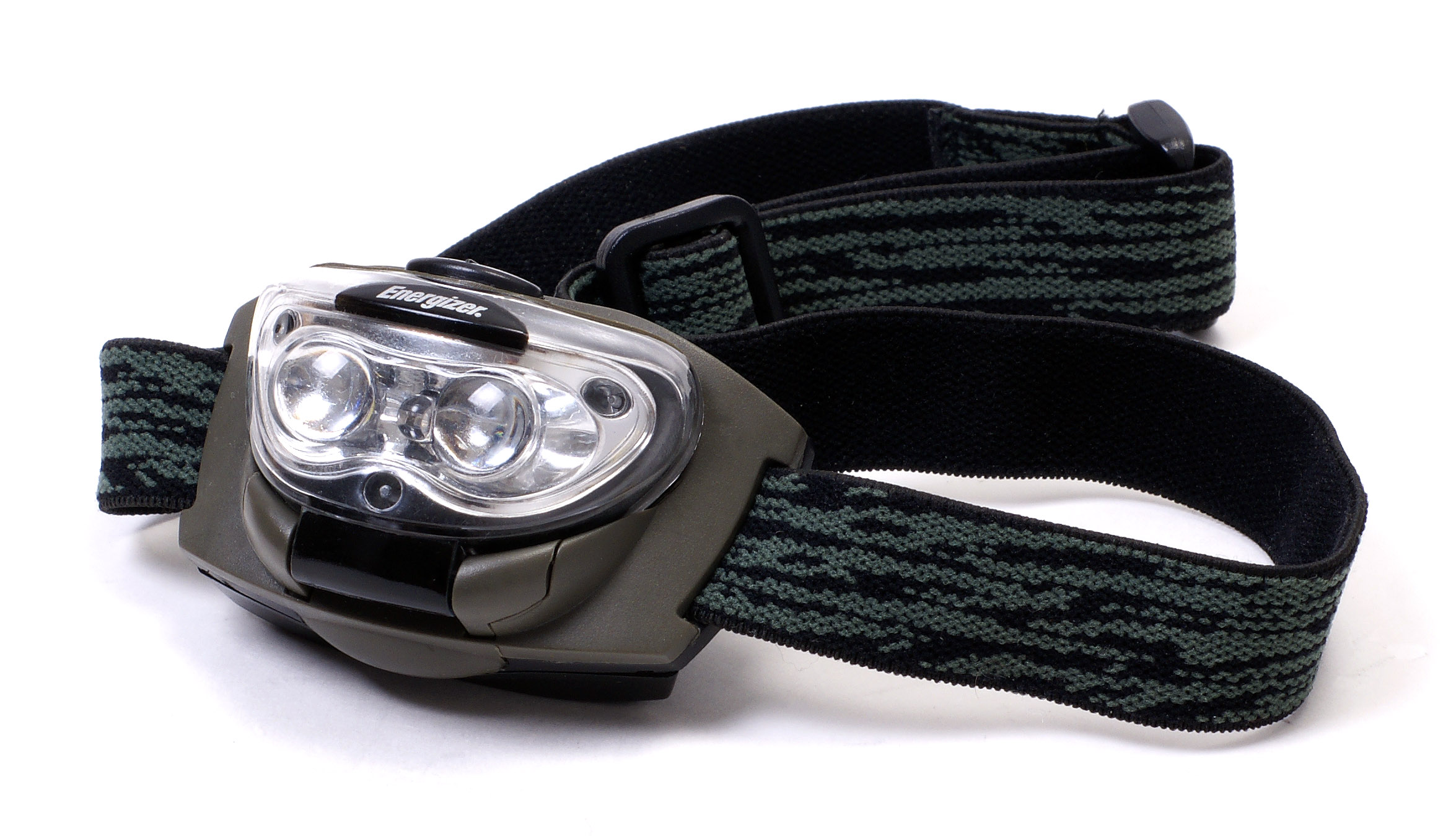
An LED headlamp

A penlight is a small, pen-sized flashlight, often containing two AA or AAA batteries. In some types, the incandescent light bulb has an integral lens that focuses the light, so no reflector is built into the penlight. Others use incandescent bulbs mounted in reflectors. LED penlights are becoming increasingly common. Low-cost units may be disposable with no provision to replace batteries or bulbs and are sometimes imprinted with advertising for promotional purposes.

A headlamp is designed to be worn on the head, often having separate lamp and battery components. The battery pack may be attached at the back of the head or in a pocket to improve balance. Headlamps leave the users' hands' free. A headlamp can be clipped to the brim of a hat, or mounted on a hard hat, instead of using straps; other types resemble eyeglass frames. Similar to the headlamp, an angle-head flashlight emits light perpendicular to the length of the battery tube; it can be clipped to a headband, belt, or webbing or set on a flat surface. Some types allow the user to adjust the angle of the head. The Fulton MX991/U Flashlight was an angle-head flashlight issued to US military personnel; similar style lights remain popular.

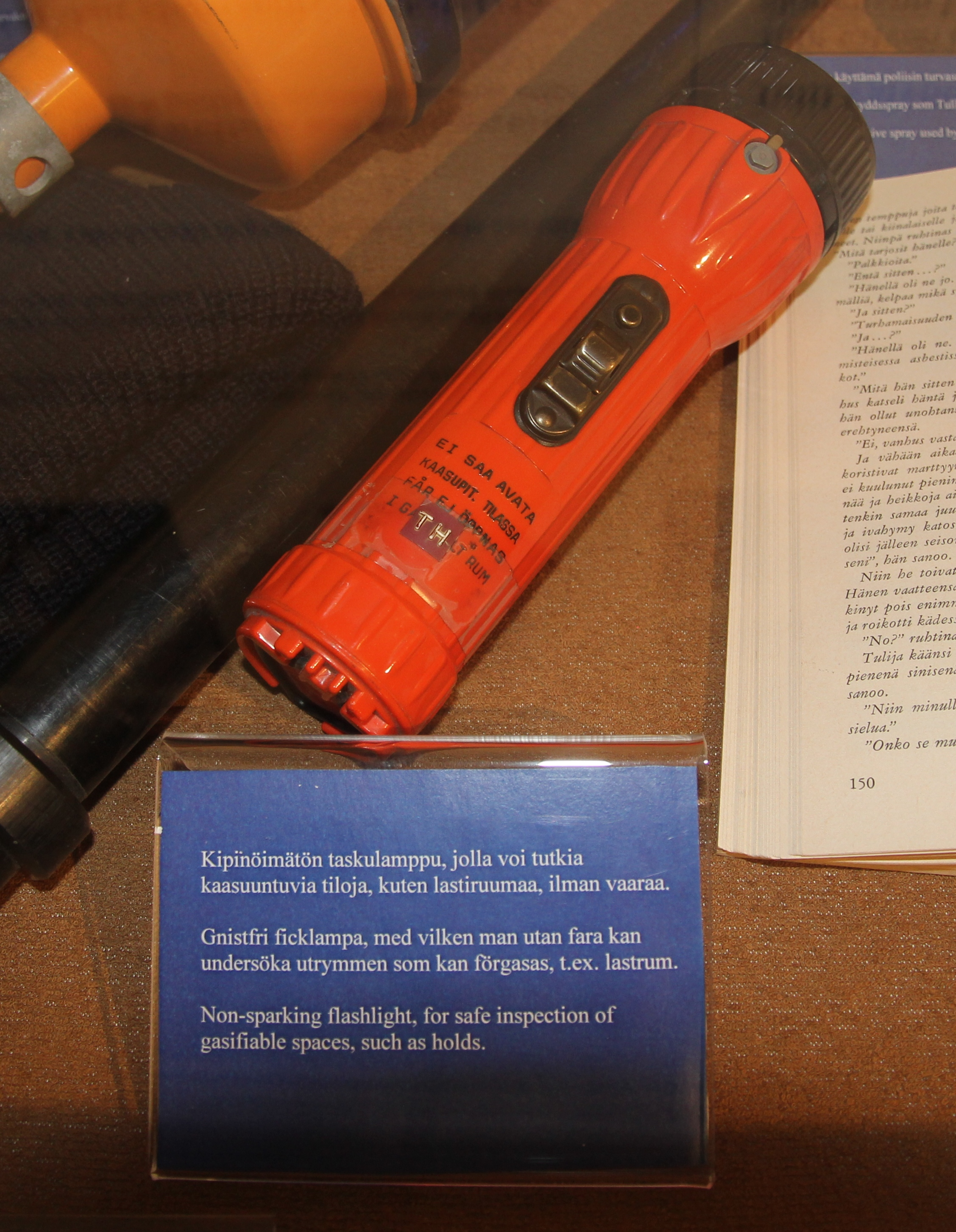
Nonincendive flashlight for use when inspecting areas full of flammable gas

Tactical lights are sometimes mounted to a handgun or rifle. They allow momentary illumination of a target. They are small enough to be easily rail-mounted to a gun barrel. Tactical lights must withstand the impact of recoil and must be easily controlled while holding the weapon.

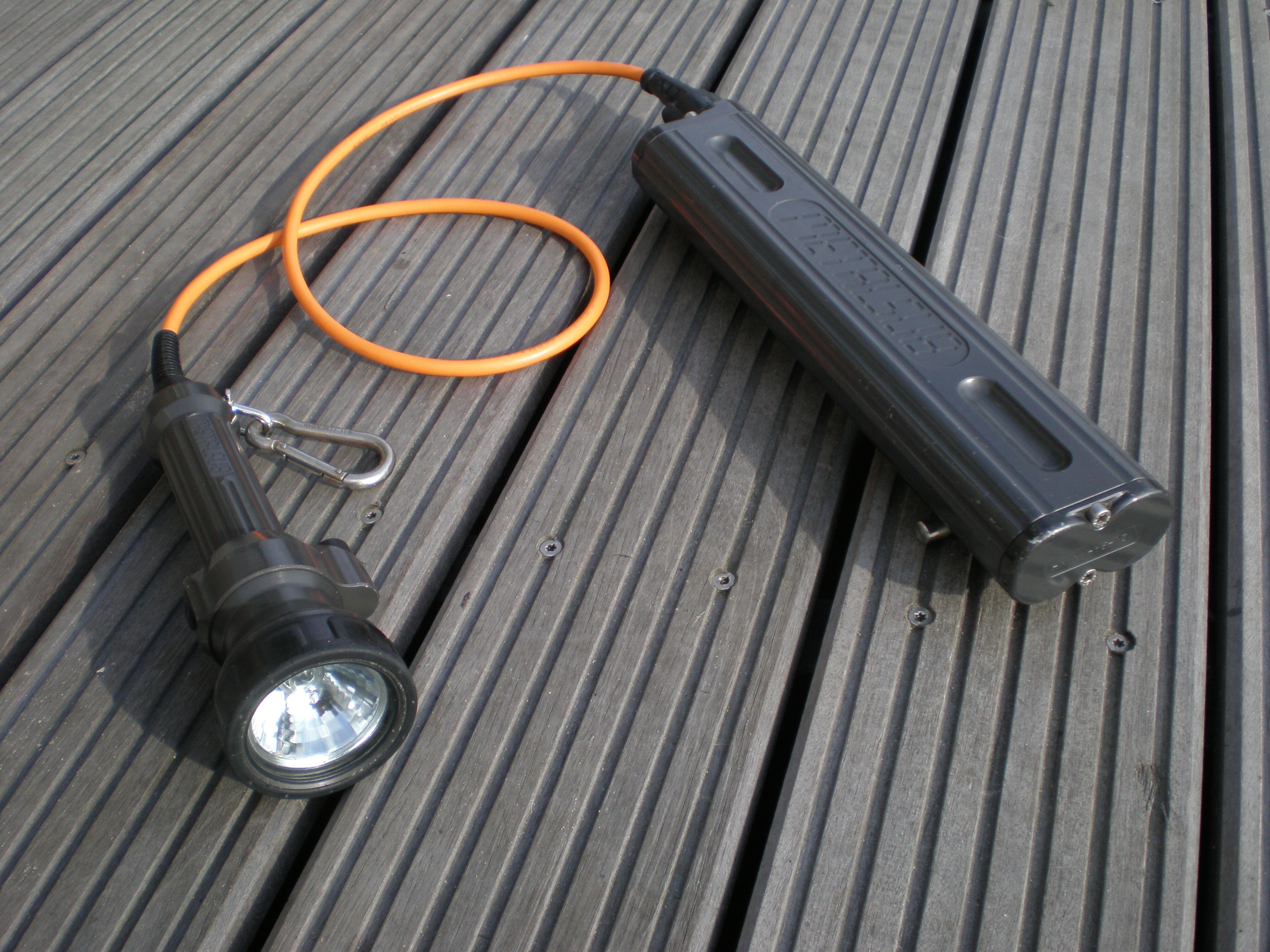
One style of diver's lamp

Although most flashlights are designed for user replacement of the batteries and the bulb as needed, fully sealed disposable flashlights, such as inexpensive keyring lights, are made. When the batteries are depleted or the bulb fails, the entire product is discarded.

Diving lamps must be watertight under pressure and are used for night diving and supplemental illumination where surface light cannot reach. The battery compartment of a dive lamp may have a catalyst to recombine any hydrogen gas emitted from the battery since gas cannot be vented in use.

People working in hazardous areas with significant concentrations of flammable gases or dusts, such as mines, engine rooms of ships, chemical plants, or grain elevators, use "nonincendive", "intrinsically safe", or "explosion-proof" flashlights constructed so that any spark in the flashlight is not likely to set off an explosion outside the light. The flashlight may require approval by an authority for the particular service and particular gases or dusts expected. The external temperature rise of the flashlight must not exceed the autoignition point of the gas, so substitution of more powerful lamps or batteries may void the approval.

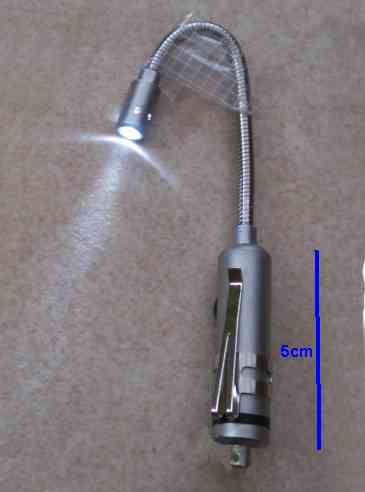
Inspection light with flexible gooseneck mounting for lamp

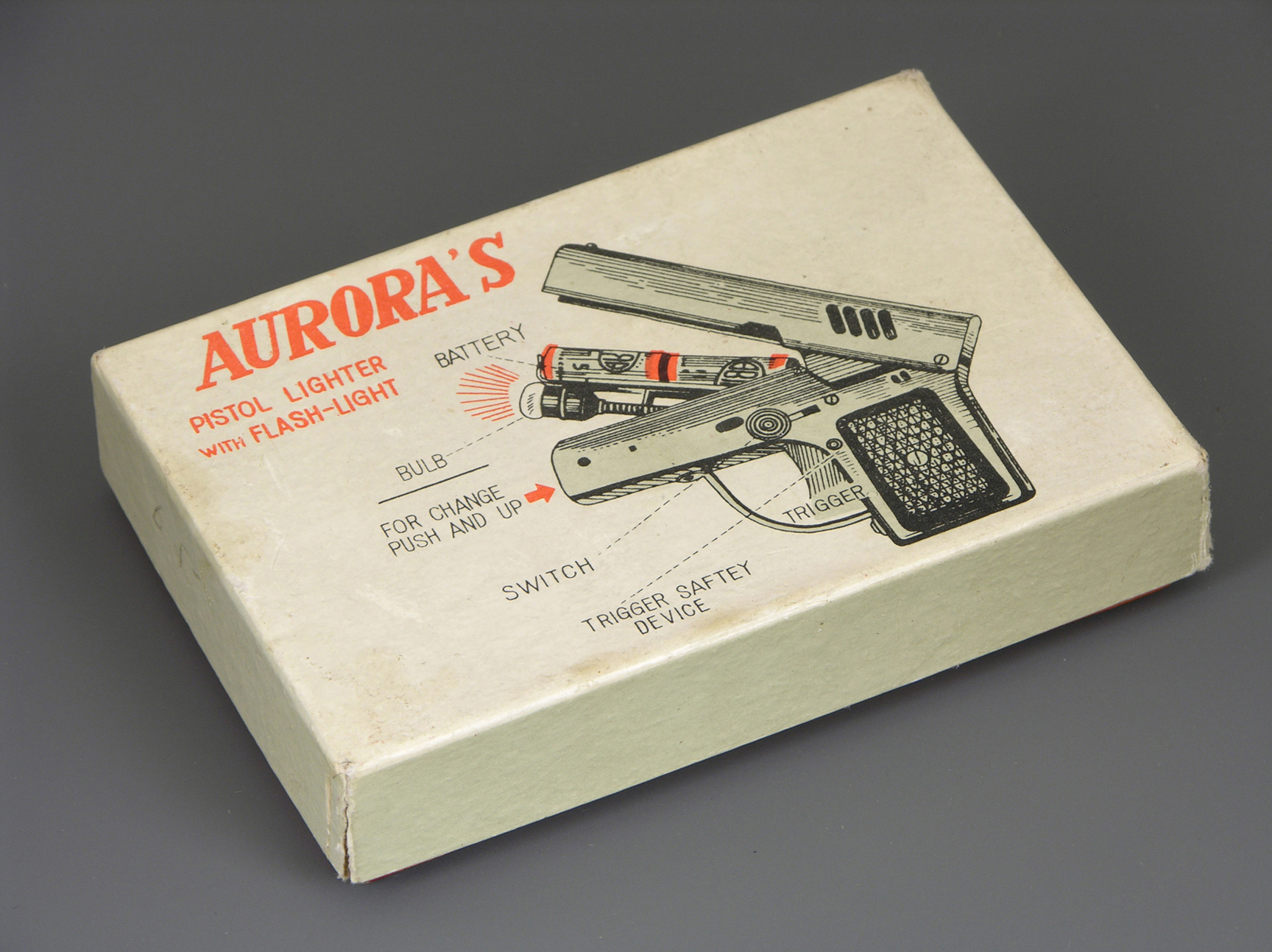
Flashlight in the shape of a gun (mid-20th century) from the permanent collection of the Museo del Objeto del Objeto

Inspection flashlights have permanently mounted light guides containing optical fibers or plastic rods. Another style has a lamp mounted at the end of a flexible cable, or a semi rigid or articulated probe. Such lamps are used for inspection inside tanks, or inside structures such as aircraft. Where used for inspecting the interior of tanks containing flammable liquids, the inspection lights may also be rated as flame-proof (explosion-proof) so that they cannot ignite liquids or vapors.

Otoscopes and ophthalmoscopes are medical instruments that combine a hand-held light source and magnifying lenses for examination of the ear canal and eyes, respectively.

Aboard naval ships, battle lanterns may be used as emergency portable lighting. Installed in major compartments of the ship, a battle lantern can be detached from its mounting and used as portable lighting in the event primary lighting is out of service. Battle lanterns may use either incandescent or LED lamps and may have either disposable primary or rechargeable batteries.

Many flashlights are cylindrical in design, with the lamp assembly attached to one end. However, early designs came in a variety of other shapes. Some resembled candlesticks, with a bulb mounted at the top of a battery tube fixed to a flat base, with a handle. Many resembled lanterns, consisting of a battery box with a handle and the lamp and reflector attached to the front. Electric lanterns are used for lighting the broad area immediately around the lantern, as opposed to forming a narrow beam; they can be set down on a level surface or attached to supports. Some electric lanterns use miniature fluorescent lamps for higher efficiency than incandescent bulbs. Portable hand-held electric spotlights can provide larger reflectors and lamps and more powerful batteries than tubular flashlights meant to fit in a pocket.

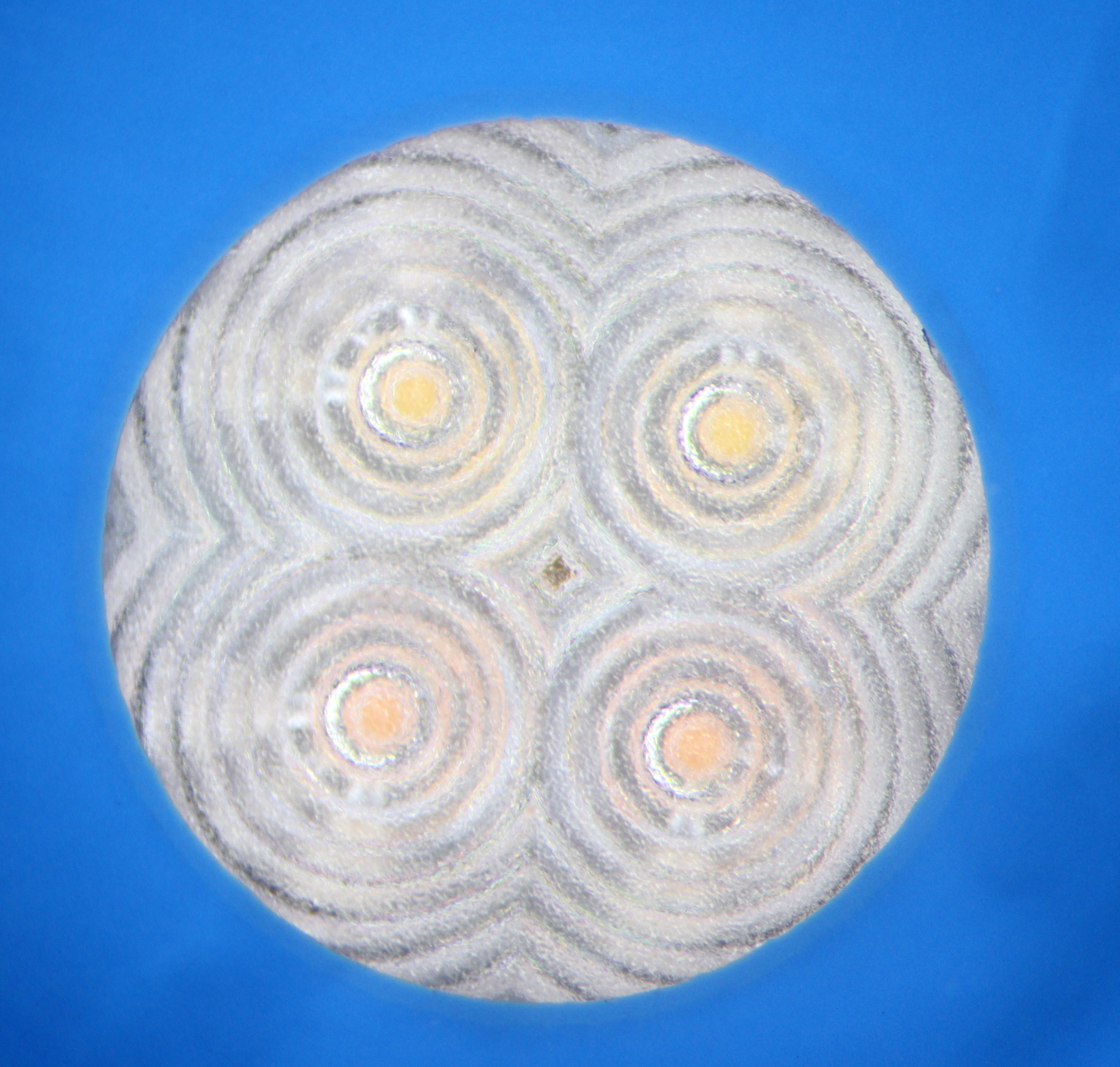
LED flash of a mobile phone

Multifunction portable devices may include a flashlight as one of their features, for example, a portable radio/flashlight combination. For example software applications turned up the screen backlights to full intensity or to switch on the camera flash or video light. In 2013, iPhone smartphones were updated with iOS 7 to have a built-in function to switch on the camera flash providing a "flashlight".

In addition to utilitarian flashlights, novelty, toy, and ornamental portable electric lights have been made in a myriad of shapes; in the 1890s, one of the earliest portable battery light applications was a type of novelty porcelain tie pin with a concealed bulb and battery. Children's toy flashlights may include lenses to project pictures on walls, or colored light, as well as providing white light.

== Power sources ==
=== Batteries ===
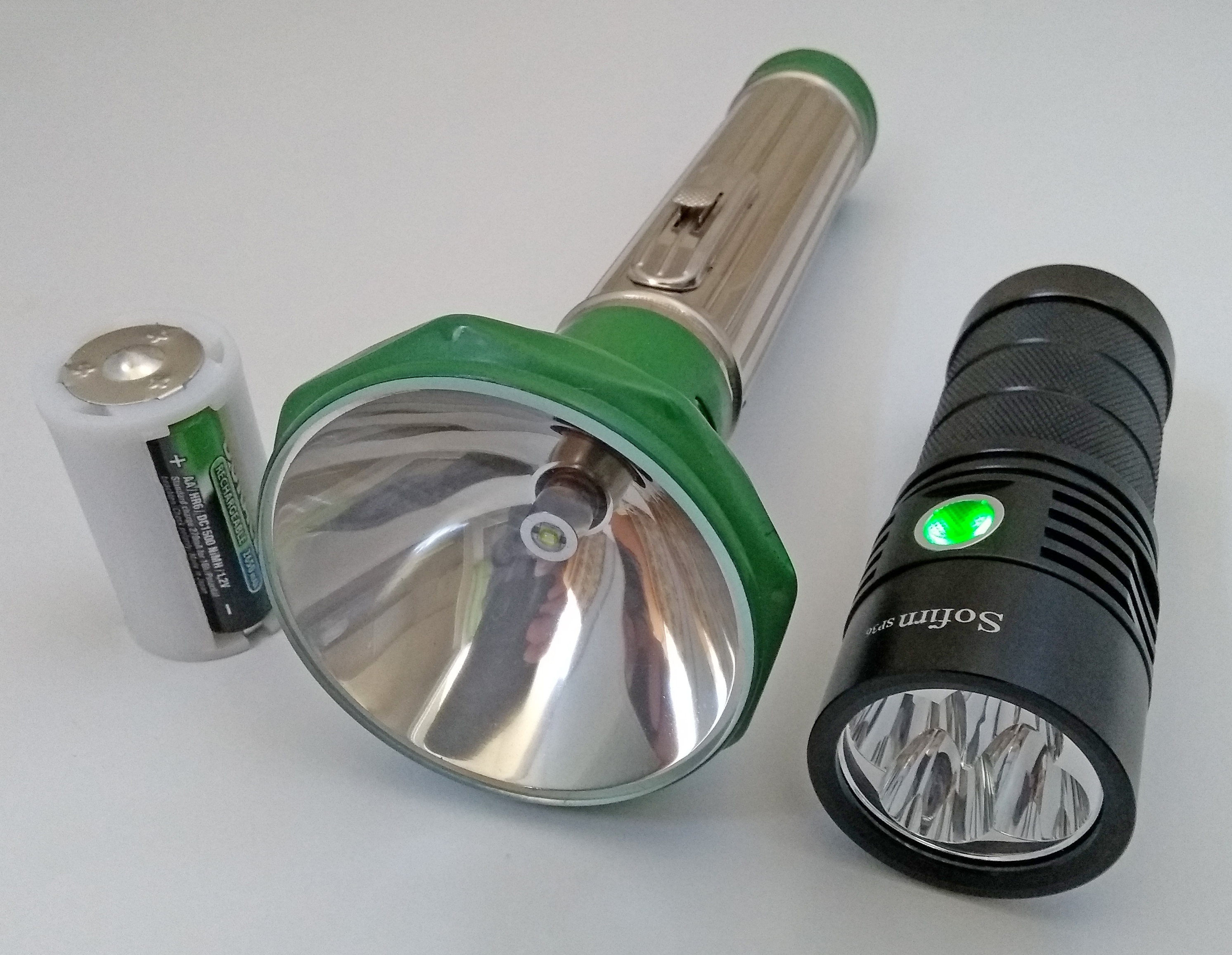
Left to right: 3x AA to D parallel battery converter with rechargeable NiMH AA-size batteries inserted. MY DAY vintage flashlight. It uses 1.5 V D-size batteries. Sofirn SP36 flashlight. It features a 5 V 2 A USB-C charging port to load 3.7 V 18650 rechargeable lithium-ion batteries.

The most common power source for flashlights is the battery. Primary battery (disposable) types used in flashlights include button cells, carbon-zinc batteries in both regular and heavy duty types, alkaline, and lithium.

Secondary, rechargeable types include lead-acid batteries, NiMH, NiCd batteries and lithium-ion batteries. The choice of batteries plays a determining role in the size, weight, run time, and shape of the flashlight. Flashlight users may prefer a common battery type to simplify replacement.

Primary cells are most economical for infrequent use. Some types of lithium primary cell can be stored for years with less risk of leakage compared with zinc-type batteries. Long storage life is useful where flashlights are required only in emergencies. Lithium primary batteries are also useful at lower temperatures than zinc batteries, all of which have water-based electrolytes. Lithium primary batteries have a lower internal resistance than zinc primary batteries, so are more efficient in high-drain flashlights.

Flashlights used for extended periods every day may be more economically operated on rechargeable (secondary) batteries. Flashlights designed for rechargeable batteries may allow charging without removing the batteries; for example, a light kept in a vehicle may be trickle-charged and always ready when needed. Some rechargeable flashlights have indicators for the state of charge of the battery. Power-failure lights are designed to keep their batteries charged from a wall plug and to automatically turn on after an AC power failure; the power-failure light can be removed from the wall socket and used as a portable flashlight. Solar powered flashlights use energy from solar cells to charge an on-board battery for later use.

=== Mechanical power ===
One type of mechanically powered flashlight has a winding crank and spring connected to a small electrical generator (dynamo). Some types use the dynamo to charge a capacitor or battery, while others only light while the dynamo is moving. Others generate electricity using electromagnetic induction. They use a strong permanent magnet that can freely slide up and down a tube, passing through a coil of wire as it does. Shaking the flashlight charges a capacitor or a rechargeable battery that supplies current to a light source. Such flashlights can be useful during an emergency, when utility power and batteries may not be available. Dynamo-powered flashlights were popular during the Second World War since replacement batteries were difficult to find.

=== Capacitor ===
At least one manufacturer makes a rechargeable flashlight that uses a supercapacitor to store energy. The capacitor can be recharged more rapidly than a battery and can be recharged many times without loss of capacity; however, the running time is limited by the relative bulk of capacitors compared to electrochemical batteries.

== Reflectors and lenses ==
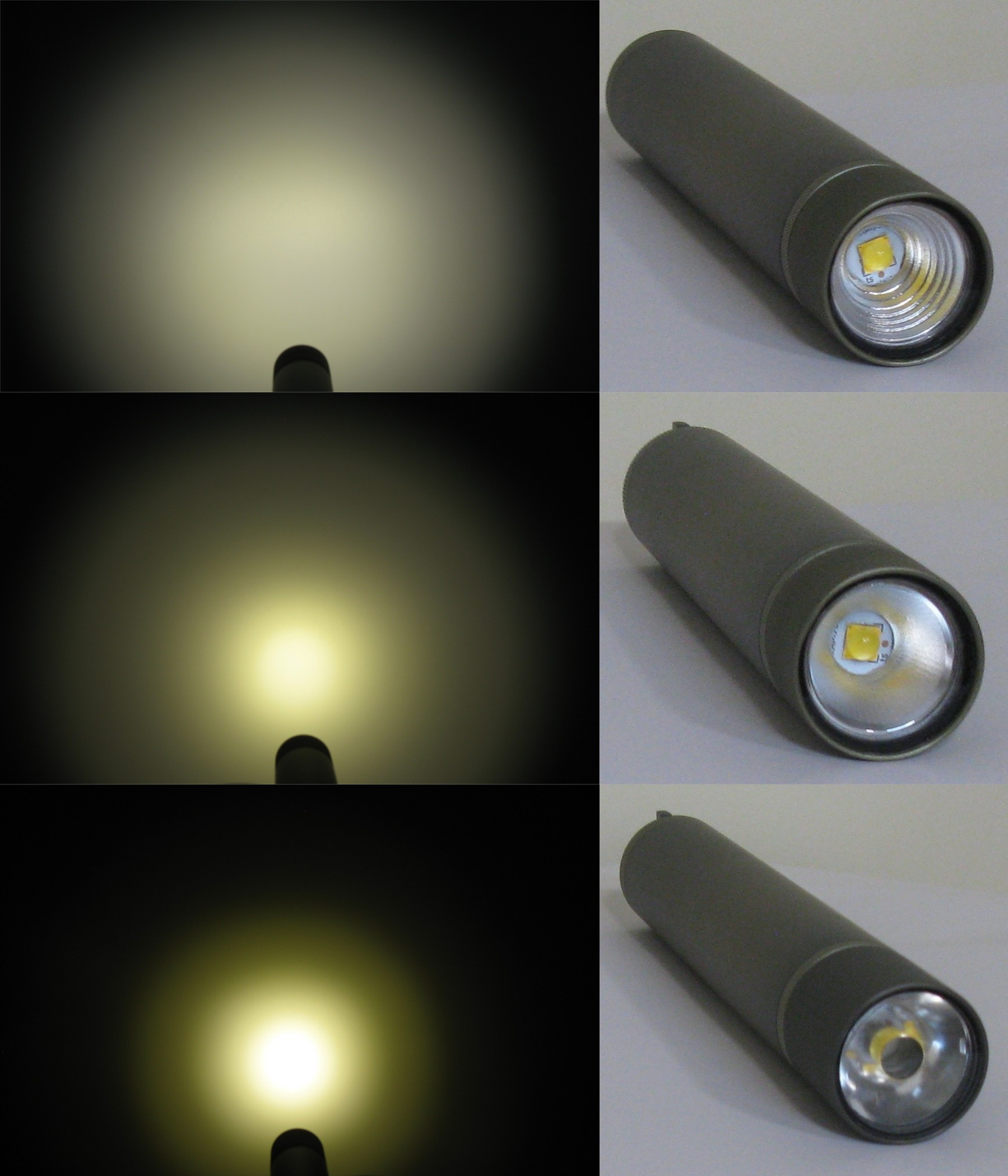
Dive flashlight with different reflectors and collimator for LED XHP70.2

A reflector with an approximately parabolic shape concentrates the light emitted by the bulb into a directed beam. Some flashlights allow the user to adjust the relative position of the lamp and reflector, giving a variable-focus effect from a wide floodlight to a narrow beam. Reflectors may be made of polished metal, glass, or plastic with an aluminized reflective finish. Some manufacturers use a pebbled or "orange peel", instead of a smooth reflector, to improve the uniformity of the light beam emitted. Where multiple LEDs are used, each one may be put in its own parabolic reflector. Flashlights using a "total internal reflection" assembly have a transparent optical element (light pipe) to guide light from the source into a beam; no reflector surface is required. For a given size of light source, a larger reflector or lens allows a tighter beam to be produced, while capturing the same fraction of the emitted light. Some flashlights use Fresnel lenses, which allow the weight of the lens to be reduced.

The reflector may have a flat transparent cover to keep out dirt and moisture, but some designs have a plastic or glass "bulls-eye" lens to form a concentrated beam. The lens or reflector cover must resist impacts and the heat of the lamp, and must not lose too much of the transmitted light to reflection or absorption. Very small flashlights may not have a reflector or lens separate from the lamp. Some types of penlight bulbs or small LEDs have a built-in lens.

A reflector forms a narrow beam called the "throw" in hobbyist parlance, while light emitted forward misses the reflector and forms a wide flood or "spill" of light. Because LEDs emit most light in a hemisphere, lens lights with the LED facing forward or reflector lights with it facing backwards radiate less spill. Variable focus "zoom" or "flood to throw" lights may move the reflector or lens or they may move the emitter; moving the emitter presents the designer with the problem of maintaining heat dissipation for the LED.

== Control ==
=== Switch ===
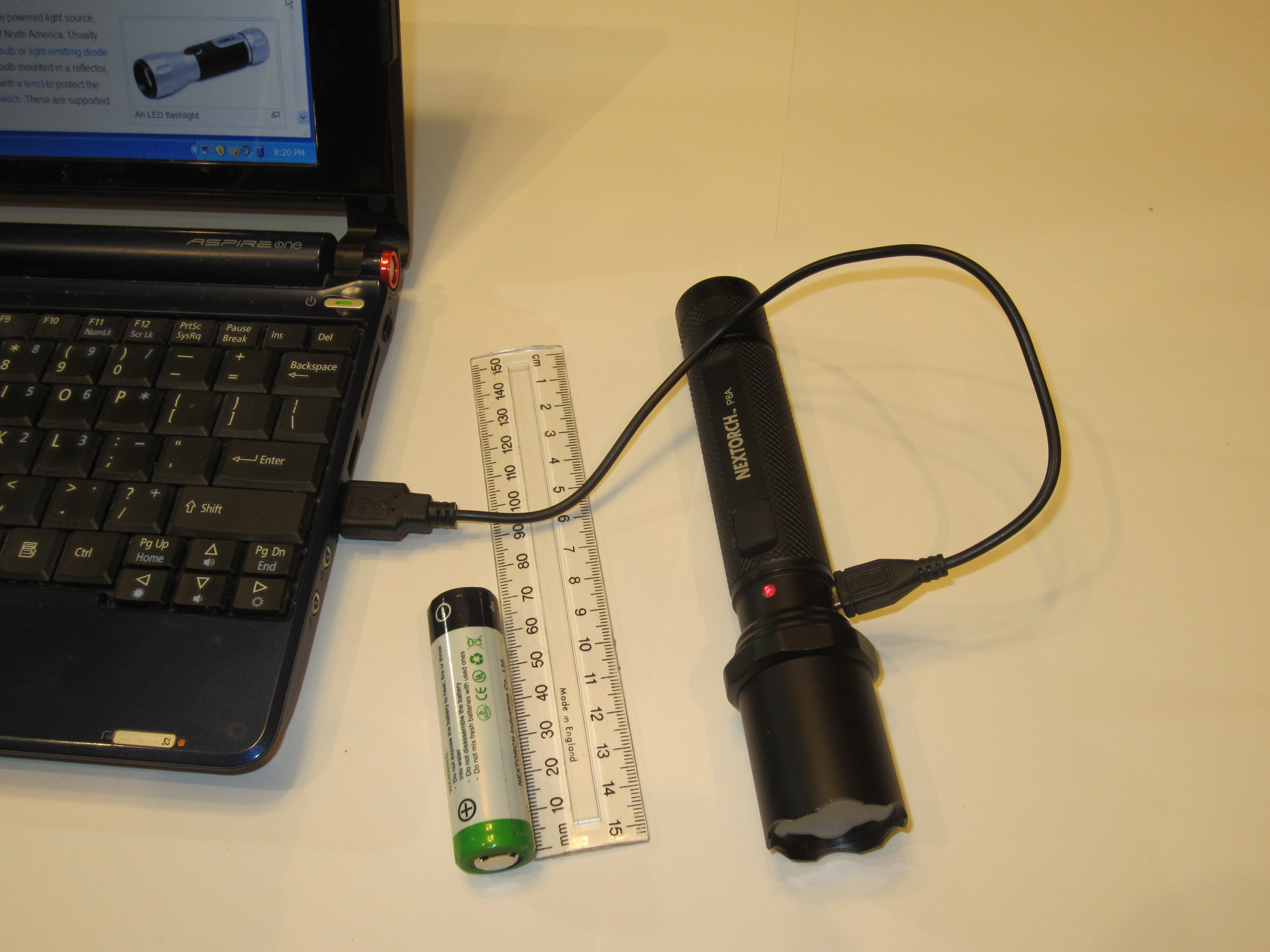
A rechargeable, programmable LED flashlight

The original 1890s flashlights used a metal ring around the fiber body of the flashlight as one contact of a switch; the second contact was a movable metal loop that could be flipped down to touch the ring, completing the circuit. A wide variety of mechanical switch designs using slide switches, rocker switches, or side-mounted or end-mounted pushbuttons has been used in flashlights. A common combination is a slide switch that allows the light to be left on for an extended time, combined with a momentary button for intermittent use or signalling. (On earlier models, the button was a switch and the slider simply locked the button down.) Since voltages and currents are low, switch design is limited only by the available space and desired cost of production. Switches may be covered with a flexible rubber boot to exclude dirt and moisture and may be backlit for easy location. Another common type of switch relies on twisting the head of the light. Weapon-mounted lights may have remote switches for convenience in operation.

Electronic controls allow the user to select variable output levels or different operating modes such as pre-programmed flashing beacon or strobe modes. Electronic controls may be operated by buttons, sliders, magnets, rotating heads, or rotating control rings. Some models of flashlight include an acceleration sensor to allow them to respond to shaking, or to select modes based on what direction the light is held when switched on. At least one manufacturer allows user programming of the features of the flashlight through a USB port. An electronic control may also provide an indication of remaining battery capacity, voltage, or provide information regarding recharging. The controls may provide automatic step-down of brightness as the battery nears full discharge, to protect the battery from damage. Other reasons that may automatically reduce brightness include temperature control of the LED emitter, and reduction in output if the flashlight can detect something covering the lens, to prevent heat damage to the lens or object.

For LED flashlights, brightness may be controlled by an adjustable constant-current regulator, or by pulse-width modulation (PWM) that adjusts the duty cycle of the LED to provide apparent variation in average brightness. In some flashlight systems, the PWM control might cause detectable flicker in the flashlight's beam, especially when moving or aimed at moving objects. This can be objectionable in some uses.

== Materials ==
Early flashlights used vulcanized fiber or hard rubber tubes with metal end caps. Many other materials including drawn steel, plated brass, copper, or silver, and even wood and leather have been used. Modern flashlights are generally made of plastic or aluminum. Plastics range from low-cost polystyrene and polyethylene to more complex mixtures of ABS or glass-reinforced epoxies. Some manufacturers have proprietary plastic formulations for their products. A desirable plastic for manufacturing flashlights allows for ease of molding and adequate mechanical properties of the finished flashlight case. Aluminum, either plain, painted or anodized, is a popular choice. It is electrically conductive, can be easily machined, and dissipates heat well. Several standard alloys of aluminum are used. Other metals include copper, stainless steel, and titanium, which can be polished to provide a decorative finish. Zinc can be die-cast into intricate shapes. Magnesium and its alloys provide strength and heat dissipation similar to aluminum with less weight, but they corrode easily.

Metals may be drawn into a tubular shape, or tubular extruded stock can be machined to add threads for the head and tail cap, knurling for grip, and decorative and functional flats or holes in the body. LED flashlights may have cooling fins machined into their metal cases. Plastics are often injection molded into nearly final shape, requiring only a few more process steps to complete assembly. Metal cases provide better heat dissipation for the LED, but plastics are not electrically conductive and may resist corrosion and wear.

== Ratings and standards ==
=== Safety regulations ===
Industrial, marine, public safety, and military organizations develop specifications for flashlights in specialized roles. Typically, light output, overall dimensions, and battery compatibility and durability are required to meet minimum limits. Flashlights may be tested for impact resistance, water and chemical resistance, and the lifespan of the control switch.

Flashlights intended for use in hazardous areas with flammable gas or dust are tested to ensure they cannot set off an explosion. Flashlights approved for flammable gas areas have markings indicating the approving agency (MSHA, ATEX, UL, etc.) and symbols for the conditions that were tested. Flashlights for hazardous areas may be designed to automatically disconnect the lamp if the bulb is broken, to prevent ignition of flammable gas.

Regulations for ships and aircraft specify the number and general properties of flashlights included as part of the standard safety equipment of the vessel. Flashlights for small boats may be required to be waterproof and to float. Uniformed services may issue particular models of flashlights, or may provide minimum performance standards for their members to follow when purchasing their own flashlights.

=== Performance standards ===
The United States Army former standard MIL-F-3747E described the performance standard for plastic flashlights using two or three D-cell dry batteries, in either straight or angle form, and in standard, explosion-proof, heat-resistant, traffic direction, and inspection types. The standard described only incandescent lamp flashlights and was withdrawn in 1996.

In the United States, ANSI in 2009 published FL1 Flashlight basic performance standard. This voluntary standard defines test procedures and conditions for total light output, beam intensity, working distance, impact and water resistance, and battery running time to 10% of initial light output. The FL1 standard gives definitions for terms used in marketing flashlights, with the intention of allowing the consumer to compare products tested to the standard. The standard recommends particular graphic symbols and wording for the product package, so that the consumer can identify products tested to the standard. Testing may be carried out by the manufacturer itself or by a third-party test laboratory.

The FL1 standard requires measurements reported on the packaging to be made with the type of batteries packaged with the flashlight, or with an identified type of battery. Initial light output is measured with an integrating sphere photometer, 30 seconds after the light is switched on with fresh (or newly charged) batteries. The total light emitted is reported in lumens. Luminous intensity is determined by measuring the brightest spot in the beam produced by the flashlight, in candelas. Since this is a measure of all the light emitted in a solid angle (the "cone" of light in a particular direction), the beam intensity is independent of distance.

The working distance is defined as the distance at which the maximum light falling on a surface (illuminance) would fall to 0.25 lux. This is comparable to a full moon on a clear night. The distance is calculated from the square root of (the beam intensity in candelas divided by 0.25 lux); for example, a beam intensity of 1000 candelas produces a working range rating of the square root of (1000/0.25), or 63 meters. The result is reported in meters or feet. The working distance is from the point of view of the user of the flashlight. A light directly pointed at an observer may be visible against a dark background for many times this distance, especially if the observer has night-vision equipment.

Run time is measured using the supplied or specified batteries and letting the light run until the intensity of the beam has dropped to 10% of the value 30 seconds after switching on. The standard does not evaluate the behavior of the flashlight output during run time. A regulated flashlight may run at only a slowly declining output and then abruptly cut off, but unregulated types may have steeply-declining light output after only a short time. Manufacturers of headlamps may use a different standard which rates run times until light output falls to 1 lux at 2 meters distance; this value is not comparable to the FL 1 runtime measurement.

Impact resistance is measured by dropping the flashlight in six different orientations and observing that it still functions and has no large cracks or breaks in it; the height used in the test is reported. Water resistance, if specified, is evaluated after impact testing; no water is to be visible inside the unit and it must remain functional. Ratings are given in IP Code terms, where jet spray corresponds to IP X6, brief immersion to IPX7, 30 minutes immersion at 1 meter or more is IP X8; (the depth is reported if greater than 1 meter). An IP X8 rating by FL1 does not imply that the lamp is suitable for use as a diver's light since the test protocol examines function of the light only after immersion, not during immersion.

The consumer must decide how well the ANSI test conditions match their requirements, but all manufacturers testing to the FL1 standard can be compared on a uniform basis. The light measurements are more directly related to the use of flashlights than is the nominal power input to the lamp (watts), since different LED and incandescent lamp types vary widely in the amount of light produced per watt. Even the same LED or lamp in different optical systems will show different beam characteristics. The visibility of objects depends on many factors as well as the amount of light emitted by the flashlight.

ANSI standard FL1 does not specify measurements of the beam width angle but the candela intensity and total lumen ratings can be used by the consumer to assess the beam characteristics. Where two flashlights have similar total light (lumen) measures, the unit with the higher candela rating produces a more concentrated beam of light, suitable for lighting distant objects; it will also have a higher working distance. If two lights have similar candela ratings, the light with higher lumen value will produce a wider beam and will light a wider area overall. A beam width (containing most of the power of the beam, or "hot spot") of a few degrees corresponds to a spot light, useful for searching for distant objects; beam widths of 20 degrees or more are described as flood lights, suitable for lighting a wide nearby area. Typically even a flashlight beam with a small hot spot will have some light visible as "spill" around the spot.

In 2018, in the United States, Underwriter's Laboratories published UL standard 1576 for flashlights and lanterns, outlining safety requirements and performance tests.

== Applications ==
Lumen ranges of flashlights
Lumens (range)	Type	Applications
1–20	Keychain	Finding keyholes, close range use, supplement to dark-adapted vision, walking in the dark
30 to 100	General purpose	Household use, car repairs, hiking on a trail, cave exploration
100 and above	Tactical flashlights	Handheld lights for law enforcement, military & weapon mounted lights
200 and above	Bicycle headlamps	Light use depends on speed, quality of trail, surrounding light
1000 and up	High powered	Outdoors, search and rescue, caving, night orienteering, high-speed bicycle use, night mountain biking, diving

== See also ==
- Bicycle lighting
- Carbide lamp
- DME torch
- Flashlight tag
- Glow stick
- Headlamp (for automobile lighting)
- Kerosene lamp
- Lantern
- Lantern battery
- List of battery sizes
- List of battery types
- Safety lamp
- Searchlight
- Spotlighting
- Torch
- Tactical light
- Tritium illumination
- Trouble light
- Wheat lamp
