= Don Lind =

American astronaut (1930–2022)

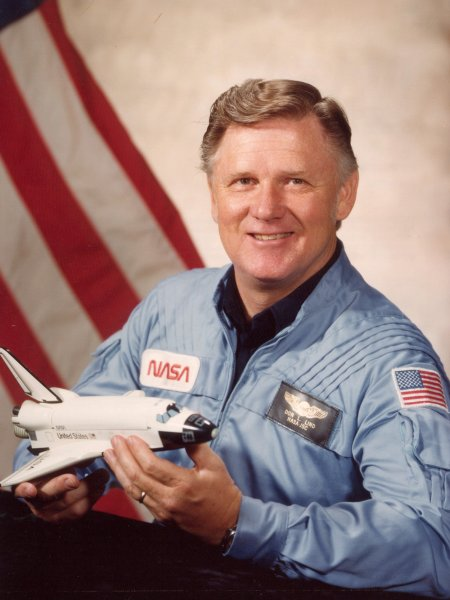
- Born: Don Leslie Lind; May 18, 1930; Midvale, Utah, U.S.
- Died: August 30, 2022 (aged 92); Logan, Utah, U.S.
- Education: University of Utah (BS); University of California, Berkeley (MS, PhD)
- Space career

NASA astronaut
- Rank: Commander, USNR
- Time in space: 7d 0h 8m
- Selection: NASA Group 5 (1966)
- Missions: STS-51-B
- Retired: April 1986
- Scientific career
- Fields: Physics
- Thesis: Differential Distribution of Charge-Exchange and Inelastic Neutrons in Π^{−}-p Interactions at 313 and 371 MeV (1964)

Don Leslie Lind (May 18, 1930 – August 30, 2022) was an American scientist, naval officer, aviator, and NASA astronaut. He graduated from the University of Utah with an undergraduate degree in physics in 1953. Following his military service obligation, he earned a PhD in high-energy nuclear physics from the University of California, Berkeley in 1964.

Lind was a Naval Aviator and attained the rank of commander in the United States Naval Reserve. After completing his doctorate, Lind worked at NASA's Goddard Research Center from 1964 to 1966. Selected with Astronaut Group 5 in 1966, he helped to develop the Apollo 11 EVA activities, and served as CAPCOM for the Apollo 11 and Apollo 12 missions. Lind was then assigned as backup pilot for Skylab 3 and Skylab 4 and would have flown on Skylab Rescue.

Lind was the payload commander on his only flight, STS-51-B, launched April 29, 1985. He designed an experiment to capture the Earth's aurora. The payload experiments consisted primarily of microgravity research and atmospheric measurement. The Orbiter Challenger completed 110 orbits before landing at Edwards Air Force Base, California.

== Biography ==
=== Early life and education ===
Lind was born May 18, 1930, and raised in Midvale, Utah, with his two sisters, Charlene and Kathleen. He attended Midvale Elementary School and graduated from Jordan High School in 1948. He was an Eagle Scout with the Boy Scouts of America, its highest rank. He received a Bachelor of Science degree with high honors in physics from the University of Utah in 1953.

As a Naval Aviator, Lind volunteered to take high-altitude photo emulsions of cosmic rays for the University of California, Berkeley during flights. This helped him enroll at Berkeley, where Lind researched pion-nucleon scattering in the Lawrence Radiation Laboratory and earned a PhD in high-energy nuclear physics in 1964. During a leave of absence from NASA, he conducted postdoctoral research at the Geophysical Institute of the University of Alaska Fairbanks from 1975 to 1976.

=== Navy service ===
Upon completing his undergraduate education, Lind was initially drafted by the United States Army as a potential infantryman amid the Korean War; following "expert maneuvering," he instead enrolled at the United States Navy Officer Candidate School at Newport, Rhode Island. After jokingly requesting flight training, Lind was unable to change his assignment and found that he enjoyed flying. He received his Wings of Gold in 1955 at Naval Air Station Corpus Christi and served four years on active duty with the Navy at San Diego and aboard the carrier USS Hancock. Lind logged more than 4,500 hours of flight time during his naval and NASA careers, 4,000 of which were in jet aircraft. He continued to serve in the United States Naval Reserve after completing his service obligation, attaining his terminal rank of commander in 1969.

=== NASA career ===
==== Pre-astronaut and selection ====
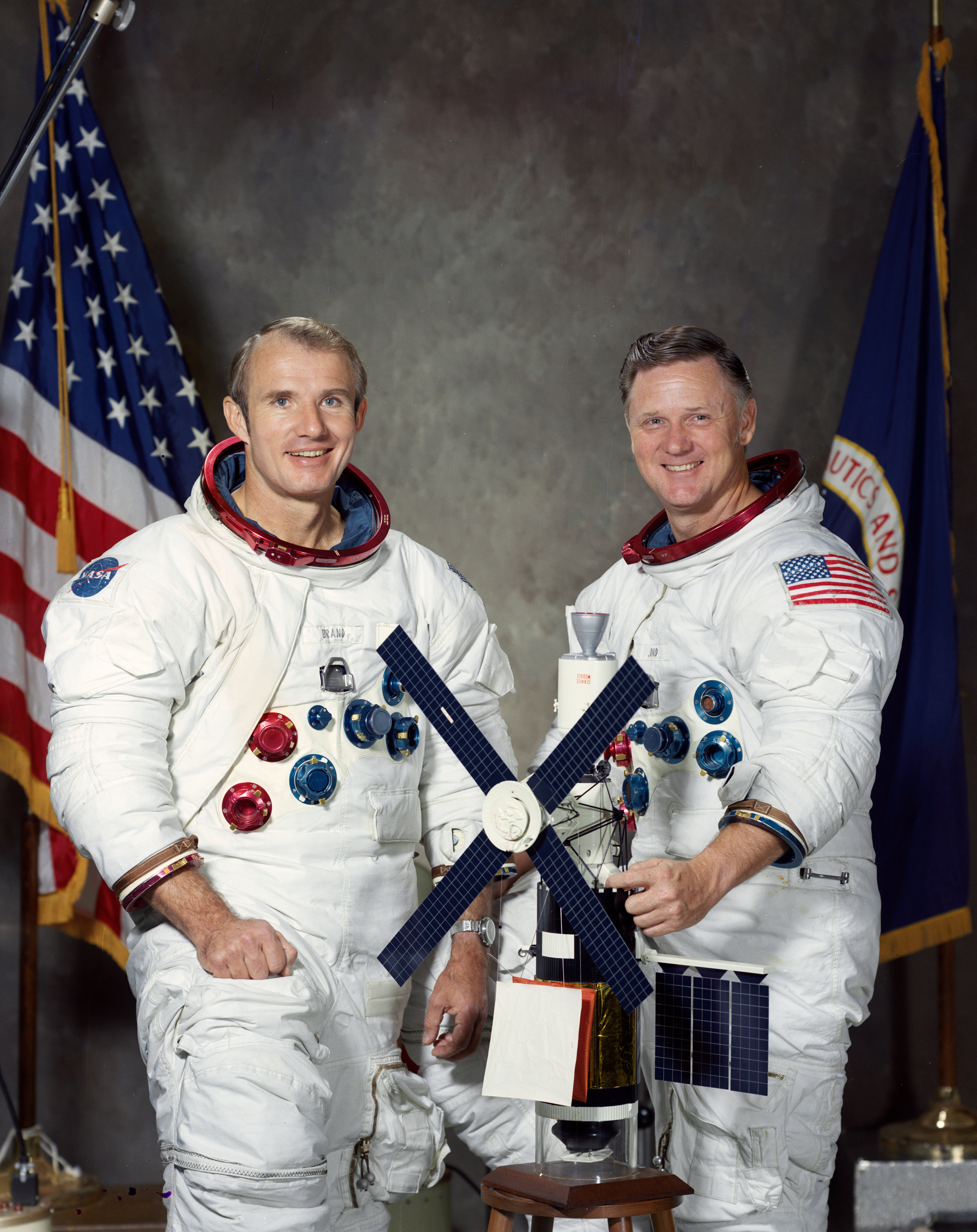
Lind with Vance D. Brand (left) as a Skylab rescue crew

From 1964 to 1966, Lind worked at the NASA Goddard Space Flight Center as a space physicist. He was involved in experiments to determine the nature and properties of low-energy particles within the Earth's magnetosphere and interplanetary space. Lind applied for NASA's third group of astronauts but did not have enough flight hours, and was too old for the fourth group by 74 days, despite arguing that he would not have to learn to fly. After the age restriction changed, he was among the fifth group, the "Original Nineteen", selected in April 1966.

Lind was selected as a pilot with other "Original Nineteen" astronauts in contrast to the fourth and sixth astronaut groups, which consisted of medical doctors and Ph.D. scientists who were not qualified pilots. However, he and Group 5 colleague Bruce McCandless II (the salutatorian of his United States Naval Academy class and the recent recipient of a master's degree in electrical engineering from Stanford University) were nonetheless treated as scientist-astronauts by NASA due to their academic training and lack of test pilot experience that Deke Slayton, Al Shepard and other NASA managers emphasized; among other factors, this would delay their progression in the flight rotation.

==== Apollo ====
Along with geologist-astronaut Harrison Schmitt, Lind helped to develop and demonstrate the flight plan for the Apollo 11 EVA (including the Apollo Lunar Surface Experiments Packages that would continue to relay data following the missions) and other tools used on the lunar surface. He also served as a capsule communicator on the Apollo 11 and Apollo 12 missions. Schmitt, Lind and Owen Garriott were the only scientist-astronauts to receive advanced helicopter training, a key prerequisite for piloting the Apollo Lunar Module. Due to standard crew rotations, it is believed that Lind would have followed Schmitt as the second scientist-astronaut Lunar Module Pilot on one of the canceled Apollo missions or projected long-range Apollo Applications Program lunar survey missions.

==== Skylab ====
Amid the gradual cancellation of the later Apollo missions and the devolution of the AAP into the Skylab program, Lind was formally reassigned to the latter effort in August 1969; according to Slayton, who noted Lind's disappointment, "with the cancellation of [Apollo] 20, I could see I just wasn't going to have a flight for him". Together, Lind and Group 6 scientist-astronaut William B. Lenoir comprised the Earth Resources Group of the Skylab Branch Office.

[On Skylab 3 and 4,] I was backing up two of the most depressingly healthy people you can imagine.

— Lind

Lind served as backup pilot alongside backup commander Vance D. Brand and backup science pilot Lenoir for Skylab 3 and Skylab 4, the second and third crewed Skylab missions; was on standby for a rescue mission planned when malfunctions developed in Skylab 3's Apollo Command/Service Module (ultimately thwarted due to Brand and Lind's resourcefulness in devising a solution in the simulators) and the proposed 20-day Skylab 5 mission (scrapped in favor of the more economical extension of Skylab 4 from 56 to 84 days); and may have flown as a pilot or science pilot on Skylab B.

Astronauts knew little of why or how they were assigned to missions. By the Skylab era, Lind was informally perceived as a "scientist-pilot" because of his doctorate. According to David Shayler, Lind "could never understand why he was not on the [Skylab 4] crew as science pilot" due to his work on the mission's Earth resources package; this could be attributed in part to seniority and specialization, as all of the prime crew science pilots were drawn from Group 4. Additionally, Skylab 4 science pilot Edward Gibson (like Lind, an atmospheric physicist) had taken on a research program in solar physics and worked on the Apollo Telescope Mount while Lind was still on track to be assigned to a lunar mission. Although he cross-trained with Lenoir and briefly proposed swapping positions with his crewmate, Lind elected to retain his original assignment due to the greater likelihood of the rescue mission (which could only accommodate the commander and pilot) amid the space program's dwindling flight opportunities.

According to Michael Cassutt, in 1970, Lind "openly complained" to George Abbey (then technical assistant to Johnson Space Center director Robert R. Gilruth) about the perceived administrative machinations of Slayton and Shepard and Harrison Schmitt's assignment to Apollo 17. However, Abbey—a close friend of Schmitt who would eventually oversee Astronaut Corps assignments as director of flight operations from 1976 to 1988—took umbrage at Lind's cooperation with a 1969 report in The Washington Post that exposed rampant dissatisfaction among the scientist-astronauts. He also alleged that Lind complained about "any and all subjects" related to the space program, associating him with a coterie of scientist-astronauts (including Story Musgrave) who perceived Abbey as a "faceless 'horse-holder' who had worked his way into a powerful job." Although Abbey could not forestall Lind's eventual flight, their acrimonious relationship played a key role in hindering the astronaut's progression in the flight rotation.

When the Smithsonian Air and Space Museum received the unused Skylab B he "cried ceremonially in front of it", Lind later said; "I was ... in the right place at the wrong time". He was reassigned to the Science and Applications Directorate in 1974, formally codifying his status as a scientist-astronaut. In a 1976 memo, Chris Kraft implicitly characterized Lind as one of NASA's nine active scientist-astronauts in the context of the payload specialist program.

==== Shuttle era ====
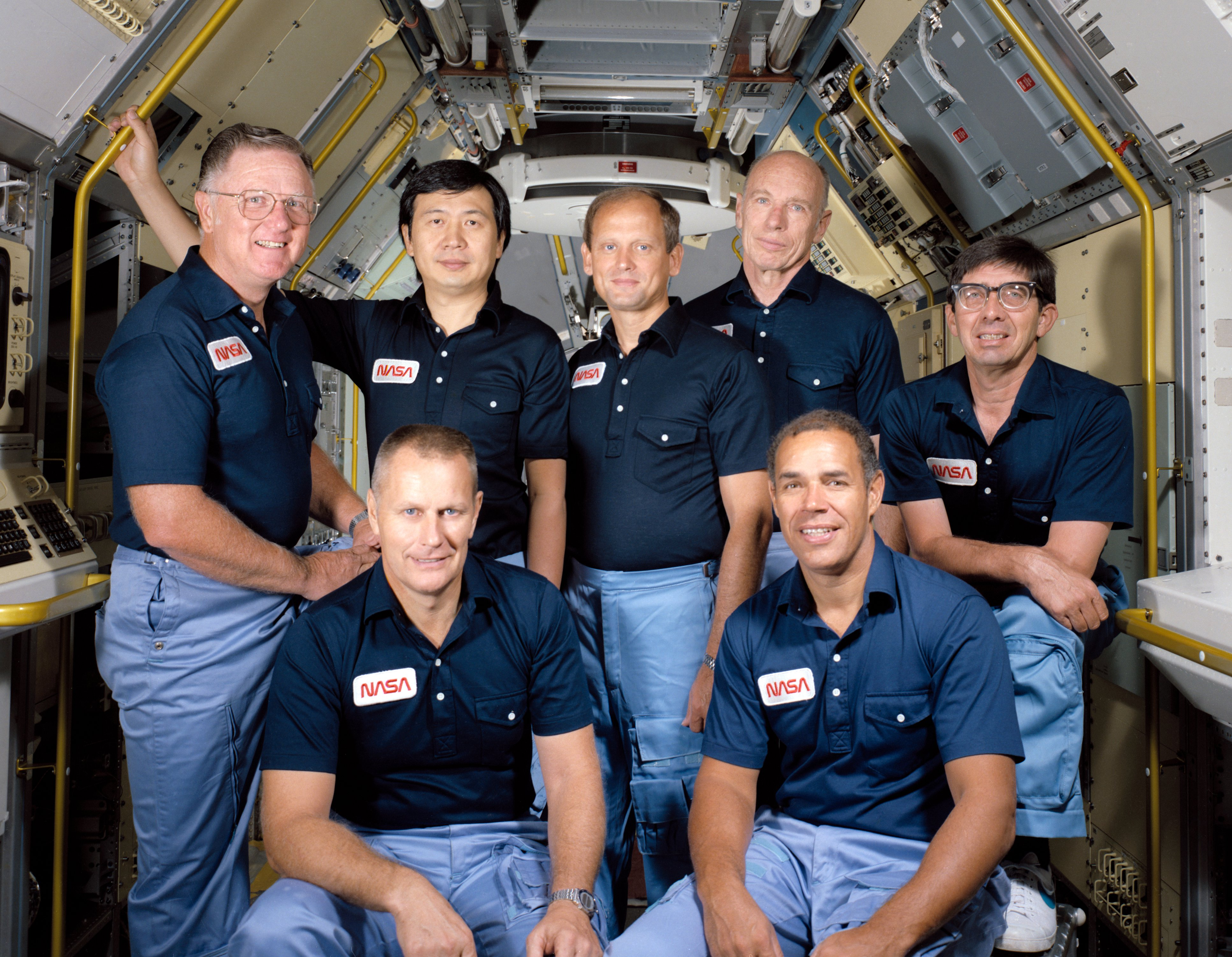
The crew of the STS-51-B mission. Lind is at the far left

For the Space Shuttle program, Lind was reassigned as a mission specialist along with McCandless (who, unlike Lind, continued to train as a potential Space Shuttle orbiter pilot until 1983) and the remaining Apollo-era scientist-astronauts. During this period, he was a member of the Astronaut Office's Operations Missions development group, responsible for developing payloads for the early Space Shuttle Orbital Flight Test (OFT) missions and the Canadarm.

Lind finally flew as the lead mission specialist and de facto payload commander on STS-51-B (April 29 to May 6, 1985), logging over 168 hours in space. Due to Apollo-era managerial preferences, his contentious relationship with George Abbey, NASA budgetary problems and delays in the Space Shuttle program, Lind waited longer than any other continuously serving American astronaut for a spaceflight: 19 years. (Note: Barbara Morgan was selected as the backup candidate for NASA's Teacher in Space Project in July 1985 and briefly assumed Christa McAuliffe's duties in the aftermath of the Challenger disaster before electing to return to teaching in the fall of 1986. She was then selected as a NASA Astronaut Group 17 Mission Specialist in 1998 and ultimately flew on STS-118 in August 2007. Although twenty-two years elapsed between her initial affiliation with NASA and her spaceflight, she was not continuously employed by the agency.) STS-51-B's average age of 48.6 was the oldest for an American space mission.

STS-51-B, the Spacelab-3 science mission, launched from Kennedy Space Center, Florida, on April 29, 1985. Following several delays, this was the first fully operational Spacelab mission. The seven-man crew investigated crystal growth, drop dynamics leading to containerless material processing, atmospheric trace gas spectroscopy, solar and planetary atmospheric simulation, cosmic rays, laboratory animals and human medical monitoring.

With the help of his Alaska postdoctoral group, Lind developed and conducted an experiment to photograph the Earth's aurora. As the experiment used a camera already on the Shuttle, NASA only needed to purchase three rolls of film for $36; Lind described it as "the cheapest experiment that has ever gone into space." After completing 110 orbits of the Earth, the Orbiter Challenger landed at Edwards Air Force Base, California, on May 6, 1985.

Lind retired from NASA on the twentieth anniversary of his selection in 1986. For nine years thereafter, he served as a professor of physics and astronomy at Utah State University, until his retirement in 1995.

== Awards and honors ==
Lind was a member of the American Geophysical Union, the American Association for the Advancement of Science, and Phi Kappa Phi. Lind was active in the Boy Scouts of America and earned the rank of Eagle Scout. He was also awarded the NASA Exceptional Service Medal in 1974, and the NASA Space Flight Medal following his Challenger flight.

== Personal life ==
Lind married Kathleen Maughan of Logan, Utah, with whom he had seven children. STS-51-B was two decades after son David's stomach aches from fear of appearing on television like the families of other astronauts, such as neighbors James Irwin and Edgar Mitchell. Kathleen said before the mission that "For our family, I think we're better off now without the publicity" as space travel became more common.

Throughout his adult life, Lind served as a member of the lay ecclesiastical hierarchy of the Church of Jesus Christ of Latter-day Saints. He served as a missionary in the Northeastern United States before graduating from college (1950–52), and after STS-51-B spoke in General Conference about his experience. He and his wife Kathleen served as public affairs missionaries in the Europe West Area of the Church, as temple missionaries in the Nauvoo Illinois Temple, and, respectively, as a counselor and an assistant matron in the presidency of the Portland Oregon Temple. During his Astronaut Corps service, Lind frequently spoke at LDS Church events throughout the United States. Lind's wife Kathleen died on June 12, 2022.

Lind died on August 30, 2022, in Logan, Utah, with many of his children and grandchildren at his bedside. His funeral was planned for September 10 in Smithfield.

== See also ==
- The Astronaut Monument
