= Skylab Rescue =

Unflown spaceflight contingency plan

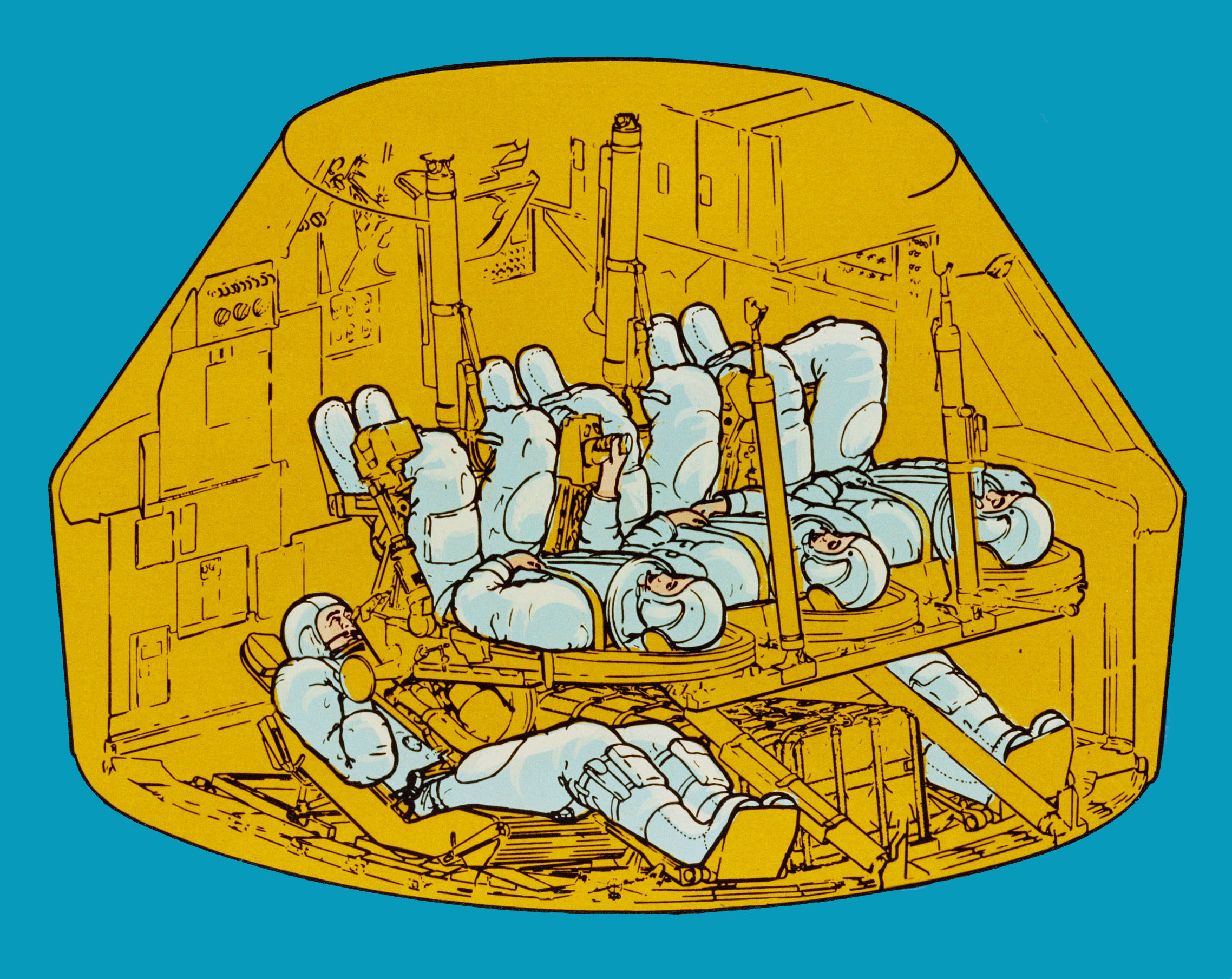
- Skylab Rescue Command Module Diagram
- Mission type: Crew rescue
- Operator: NASA

Spacecraft properties
- Spacecraft: Apollo CSM-119
- Manufacturer: North American Aviation

Crew
- Crew size: 2 at launch 5 at landing
- Members: Vance D. Brand; Don L. Lind

Start of mission
- Launch date: On standby August 1973 - February 1974 (Unlaunched)
- Rocket: Saturn IB AS-208/209
- Launch site: Kennedy LC-39B

Docking with Skylab
- Docking port: Forward
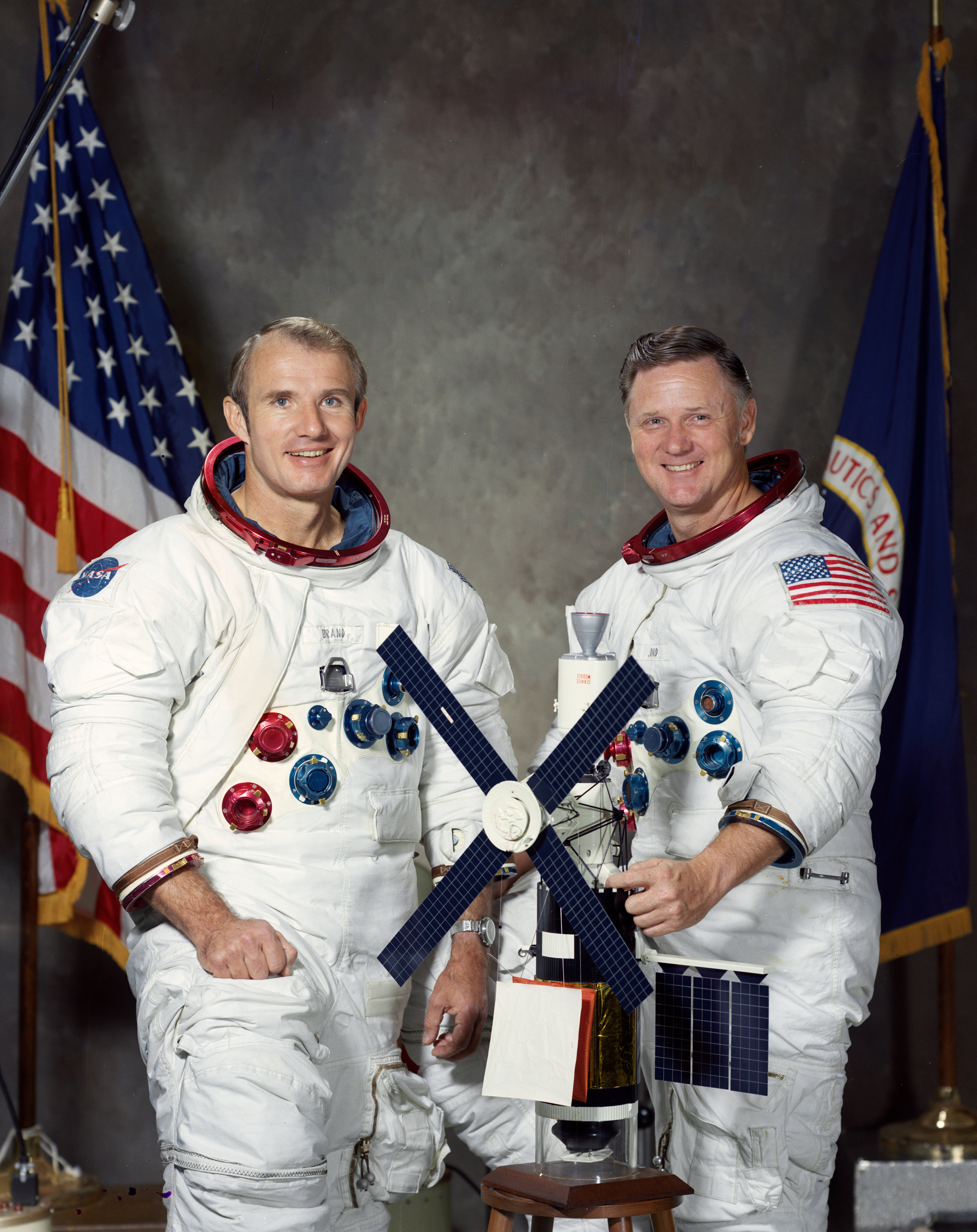
- Skylab rescue crew portrait (Left to right; Vance Brand and Don Lind)

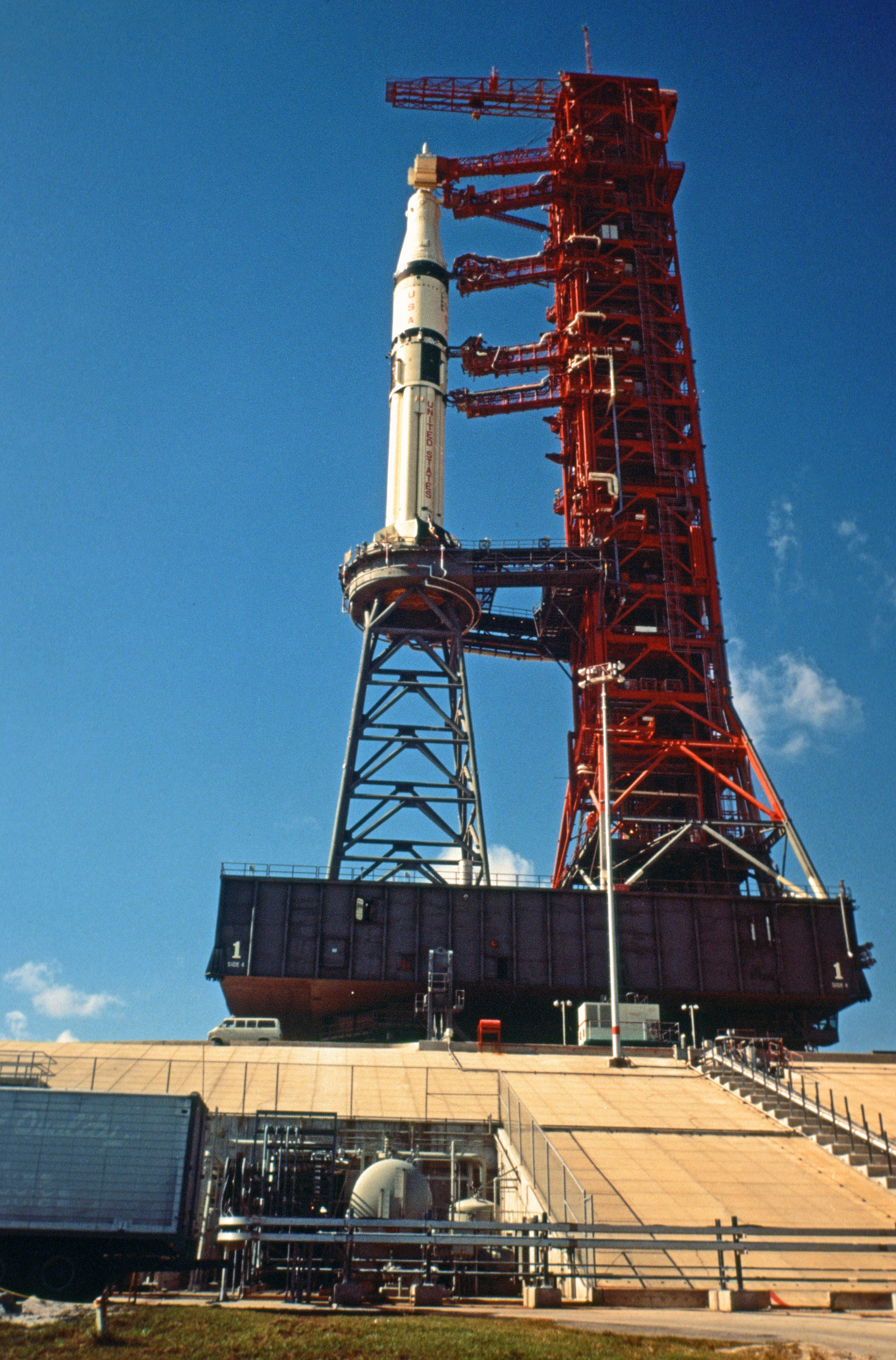
The Skylab 4 rescue vehicle at Launch Pad 39B (3 December 1973)

The Skylab Rescue Mission (also SL-R) was an unflown rescue mission, planned as a contingency in the event of astronauts being stranded aboard the American Skylab space station. If flown, it would have used a modified Apollo Command Module that could be launched with a crew of two and return a crew of five.

Astronauts Vance Brand and Don Lind were assigned as the rescue crew, in the event of the mission's necessity. A rescue mission was considered when the Skylab 3 Command/Service Module (CSM) developed problems in its reaction control system (RCS) thrusters while docked to the station. On the ground, space vehicles were assembled to fly rescue missions in support of both Skylab 3 and Skylab 4. However, no rescue mission ever proved necessary. All astronauts visiting Skylab returned safely to Earth in their original command modules.

== History ==
Plans for outfitting an Apollo Command/Service Module (CSM) as a space rescue vehicle date back to November 1965 when North American Rockwell technicians conceived the possibility of a rescue mission for astronauts trapped in lunar orbit. After a rescue mission in Earth orbit was depicted in the 1969 film Marooned, the company revived the concept in November 1970. Marshall Space Flight Center issued a formal Mission Requirements document on 17 May 1972, with subsequent revisions.

Skylab 3 astronauts Alan Bean and Jack Lousma helped design the "field modification kit" to use a standard CSM for rescue, and would have flown the CSM for their mission to rescue Skylab 2 if necessary. The standard Skylab Command Module accommodated a crew of three with storage lockers on the aft bulkhead for resupply of experiment film and other equipment, as well as the return of exposed film, data tapes and experiment samples. To convert the standard CSM to a rescue vehicle, the storage lockers were removed and replaced with two crew couches to seat a total of five crewmen. The biggest risk in a rescue was the three upper seats "stroking" or collapsing onto the two lower seats in a rough landing, but no stroking occurred in previous missions.

=== AS 208 ===
Soon after Skylab 3's launch the crew's CSM developed a problem with Quad B, one of its four reaction control system thrusters. On August 2, 1973, six days later, a snowstorm-like effect outside the station startled the crew during breakfast. What appeared to be "a real blizzard" was fuel leaking from Quad D, opposite from Quad B. The malfunctions left two available quads, and while the spacecraft could operate with just one, the leaks posed a possible risk to other systems. The fuel for all quads and the main service propulsion system (SPS) engine were from the same batch; if the SPS fuel was contaminated, the CSM might not be able to deorbit.

NASA considered bringing the crew home immediately, but because the astronauts were safe on the station with ample supplies and because plans for a rescue flight existed, the mission continued while the Saturn IB rocket AS 208 with CSM 119 was assembled in the Vehicle Assembly Building at Launch Complex 39 for possible use. It was at one point rolled out to LC-39B.

NASA announced on August 4 that Skylab 3 and Skylab 4 backup crewmen Vance Brand and Don Lind would fly any rescue mission; they had immediately begun training for the flight once the second quad had failed on August 2. After engineers found that the leaks would not disable the spacecraft, the two men used simulators to test reentry using two quads. If ground personnel worked 24 hours a day and skipped some tests, the mission could launch on September 10, and would last no more than five days. The astronauts would attempt to prepare Skylab for further use but returning experimental data and diagnosing the cause of the problem were more important, with Lind choosing what would be brought back. Human urine and feces samples and Apollo Telescope Mount and other film were the priorities. Although Skylab had two docking ports the primary one would be used if possible, jettisoning the Skylab crew's CSM if necessary.

While many within NASA believed that the rescue mission would occur, within hours of the failure of the second quad the agency canceled the rescue mission. Beyond NASA's conclusion that the failed quads would not disable the Skylab 3 CSM and the SPS fuel was uncontaminated, Brand and Lind had already shown during their training as backup Skylab crewmen that a reentry with failed quads was safe. They also devised a method to deorbit with the command module's attitude control system. Later joking that they were "very efficient but perfectly stupid, because we have literally worked ourselves out of the mission", Brand and Lind continued to train for a rescue mission, as well as for their backup roles, but the Skylab 3 crew was able to complete its full 59-day mission on the station and safely return to Earth using the two functional RCS thruster quads, using the SPS engine once instead of twice as precaution.

=== AS 209 ===
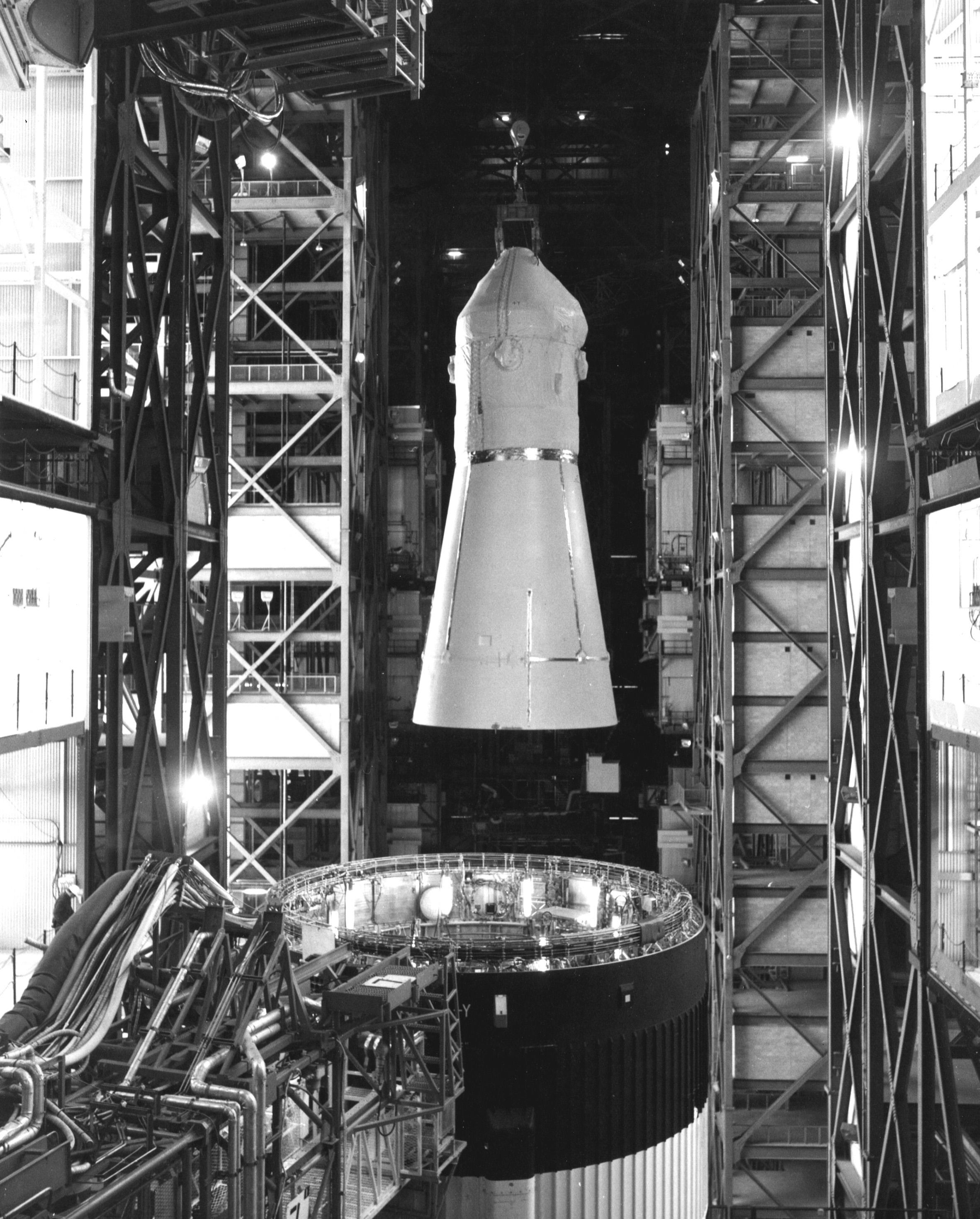
Skylab Rescue CSM being removed from its Saturn IB following the successful recovery of Skylab 4 (19 February 1974)

After the Skylab 4 launch, another rescue flight was assembled as a backup contingency. The Saturn IB rocket AS 209 was assembled in the Vehicle Assembly Building at Launch Complex 39 for possible use. It also used the CSM 119 Command Module that was to be launched with Brand and Lind.

There were also plans for a short 20-day Skylab 5 flight that would use this backup CSM. The crew, likely consisting of Brand, Lind, and Skylab backup Science Pilot William B. Lenoir, would have performed some scientific research and closed out the station until the Space Shuttle was operational. However, the extension of Skylab 4 from fifty-six to eighty-four days obviated the need for the additional mission.

== Crew ==
Position	Astronaut
Commander	Vance D. Brand
Command Module Pilot	Don L. Lind

Brand and Lind were assigned as the rescue mission's crew, had it proven necessary. Although the rescue contingency was not flown, both astronauts made later spaceflights. Brand flew in 1975 as the Command Module Pilot of the Apollo–Soyuz Test Project before commanding three Space Shuttle missions: STS-5 in 1982, STS-41-B in 1984, and STS-35 in 1990. Lind would wait another decade before he flew as a mission specialist on STS-51-B in 1985.

== Current location ==
Skylab Rescue hardware is now on display at the Kennedy Space Center Visitor Complex. CSM 119 is located in the Apollo/Saturn V Center. The Saturn IB booster for AS 209 is currently located in the Visitor Complex's Rocket Garden. It is displayed horizontally, mated to an Apollo FVV (Facilities Verification Vehicle) which was formerly displayed at the VAB's Visitor Complex circa October 1968.

In 2007, after the command module had sat untouched for over 30 years, NASA engineers used it for studies on the spacecraft's life-support adapter assembly – the projecting aerodynamic fairing that allows oxygen, water, and electricity to flow from the Service Module to the Command Module. This was in support of the design and construction of a similar system on the new Orion spacecraft, which resembles the Skylab Rescue configuration.

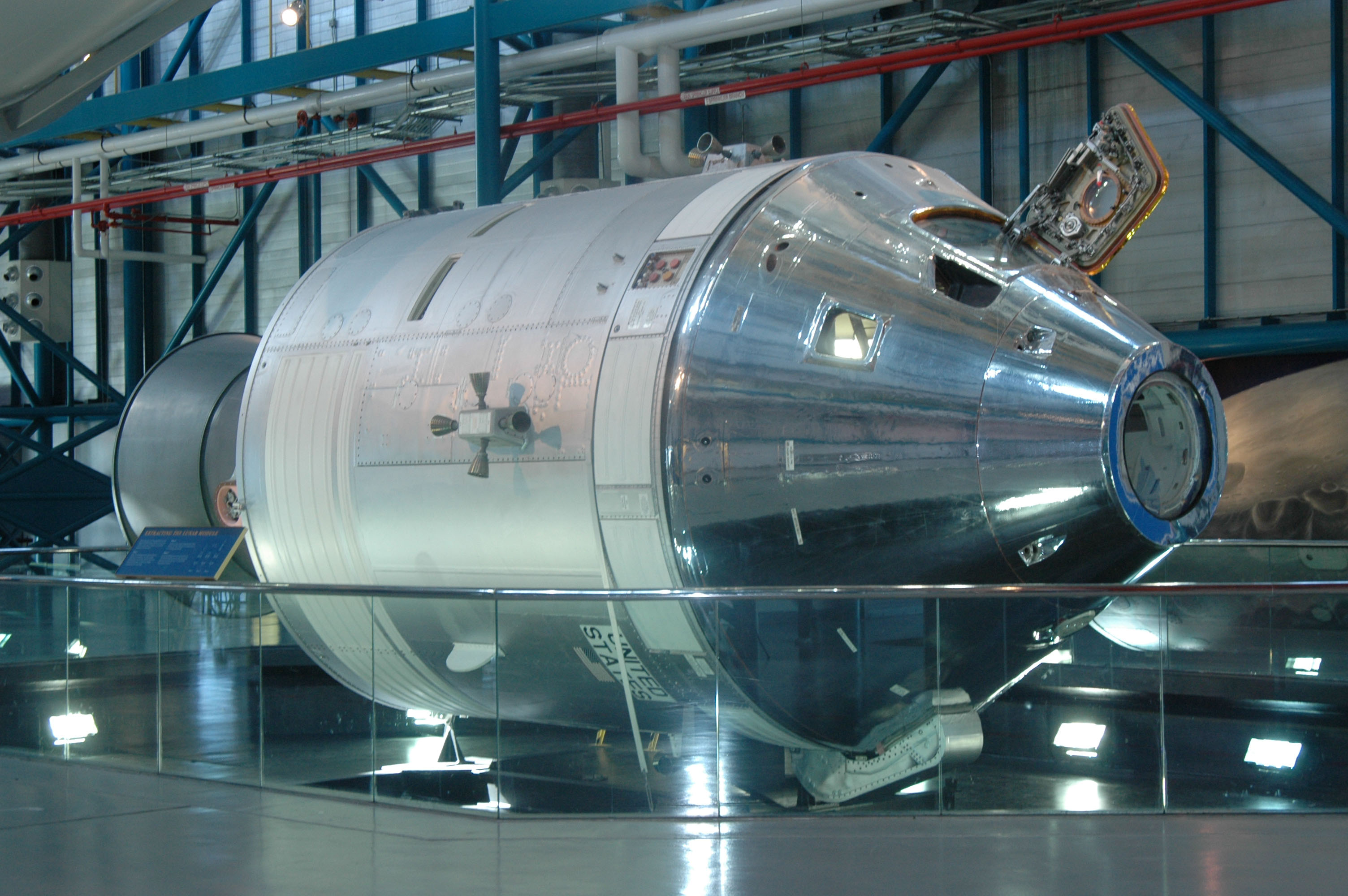
CSM 119 on display at the Apollo/Saturn V Center

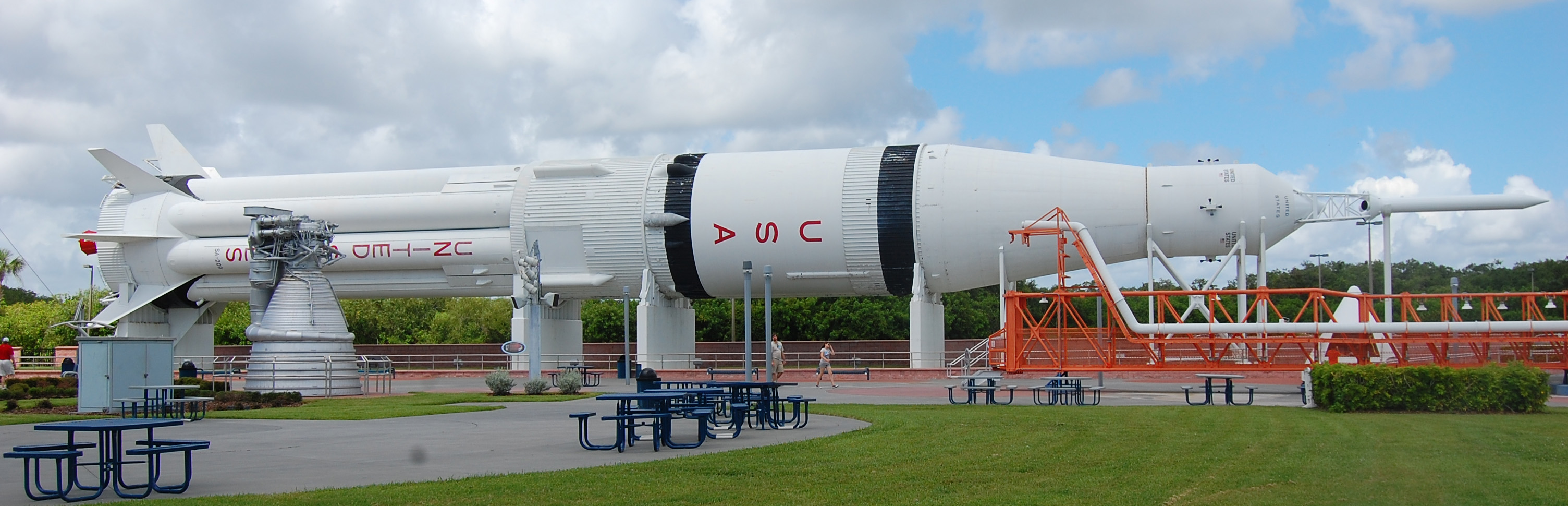
AS 209 on display at the Kennedy Space Center Visitor Complex

== See also ==
- STS-3xx
- Soyuz 32, Soyuz 33, and Soyuz 34. The crew of Soyuz 32 boarded the Soviet Salyut 6 space station, taking up residence. It was planned that the crew which launched aboard Soyuz 32 would return to Earth using the Soyuz 33 spacecraft, while the crew launching with Soyuz 33 would visit briefly and return using the older Soyuz 32 spacecraft, the latter nearing the end of its design life. However, Soyuz 33 was unable to dock, endangering the cosmonauts aboard the station. As a contingency, the Soyuz 34 spacecraft was launched to the station without a crew aboard. The crew which had docked with Salyut 6 aboard Soyuz 32 returned safely to Earth via the Soyuz 34 spacecraft.
- SpaceX Crew-9
