= Vance D. Brand =

American naval officer, aviator, aeronautical engineer and astronaut (born 1931)

Vance Brand
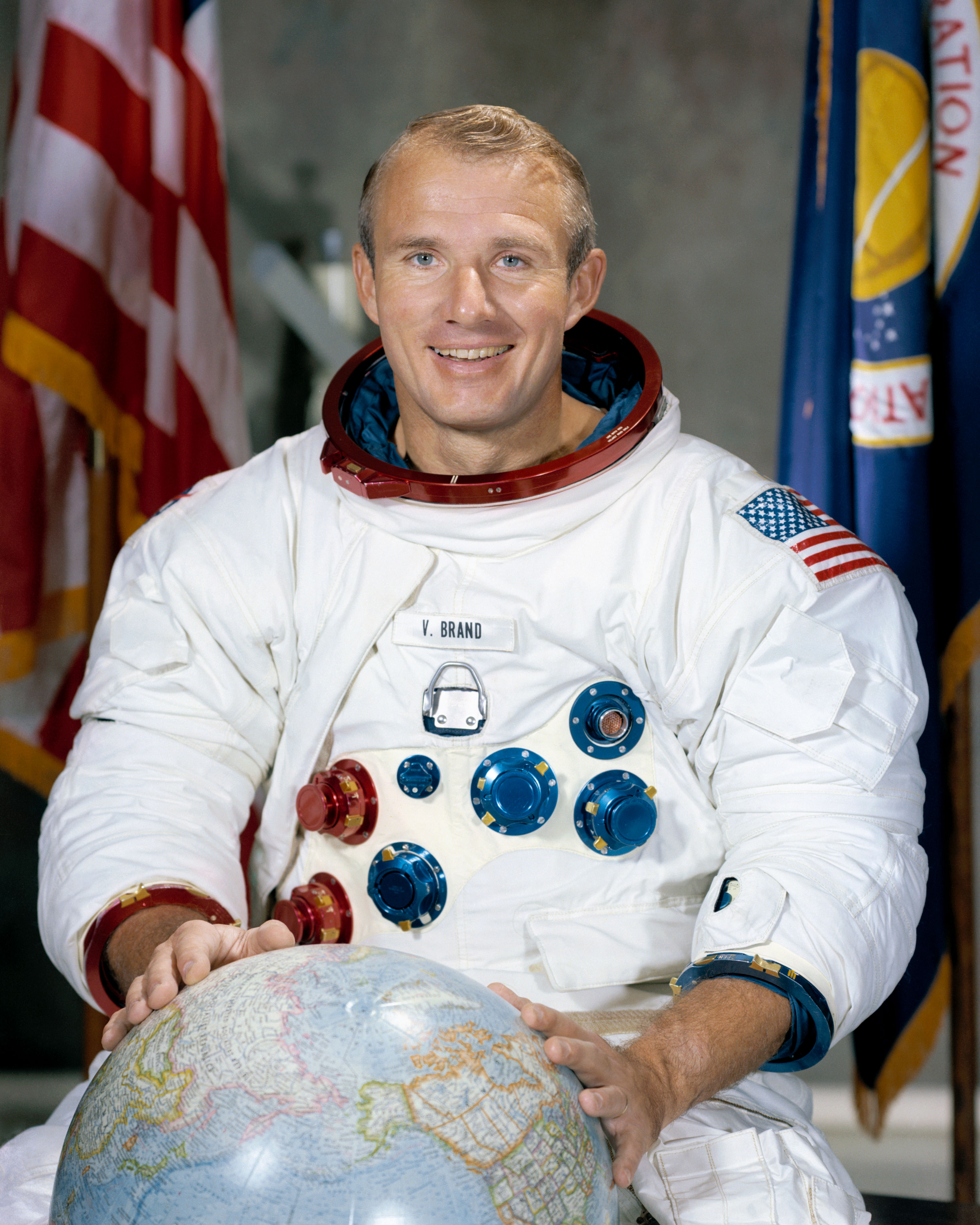
- Brand in 1971
- Born: Vance DeVoe Brand; May 9, 1931 (age 95); Longmont, Colorado, U.S.
- Education: University of Colorado, Boulder (BS, BS); University of California, Los Angeles (MBA)
- Spouse: Beverly Ann Whitnel
- Children: 6
- Awards: NASA Distinguished Service Medal
- Space career

NASA astronaut
- Rank: Major, USMCR
- Time in space: 31d 2h 02m
- Selection: NASA Group 5 (1966)
- Missions: Apollo–Soyuz Test Project; STS-5; STS-41-B; STS-35
- Retired: January 2008

Vance DeVoe Brand (born May 9, 1931) is a retired American naval officer, aviator, aeronautical engineer, test pilot, and NASA astronaut. He served as command module pilot during the first U.S.-Soviet joint spaceflight in 1975, and as commander of three Space Shuttle missions.

Brand's flight experience includes 9,669 flying hours, which includes 8,089 hours in jets, 391 hours in helicopters, 746 hours in spacecraft, and checkout in more than 30 types of military aircraft.

== Early life and education ==
Brand was born May 9, 1931, in Longmont, Colorado, and is the son of Rudolph William Brand and Donna Mae Brand (née DeVoe). He was active in Troop 64 of the Boy Scouts of America in Longmont, where he achieved its second highest rank, Life Scout. Brand graduated at Longmont High School in 1949, and at the University of Colorado at Boulder he received a Bachelor of Science degree in business in 1953 and another B.S. degree, in aeronautical engineering, in 1960. He was a member of the Sigma Nu fraternity and of the International Order of DeMolay. In 1964 he completed a Master of Science degree in business administration at UCLA.

== Military service ==
Brand was a commissioned officer and naval aviator with the United States Marine Corps from 1953 to 1957. His military assignments included a 15-month tour in Japan as a jet fighter pilot. Following his release from active duty, Brand continued service in United States Marine Corps Reserve and Air National Guard jet fighter squadrons until 1964, reaching the rank of major.

== Civilian test pilot ==
Employed as a civilian by the Lockheed Corporation from 1960 to 1966, he worked initially as a flight test engineer on the United States Navy's P-3 Orion aircraft. In 1963, Brand graduated from the U.S. Naval Test Pilot School (Class 33) and was assigned to Palmdale, California as an experimental test pilot on Canadian and German F-104 programs. Prior to selection to the astronaut program, Brand worked at the West German F-104G Flight Test Center at Istres, France as an experimental test pilot and leader of a Lockheed flight test advisory group.

== NASA career ==
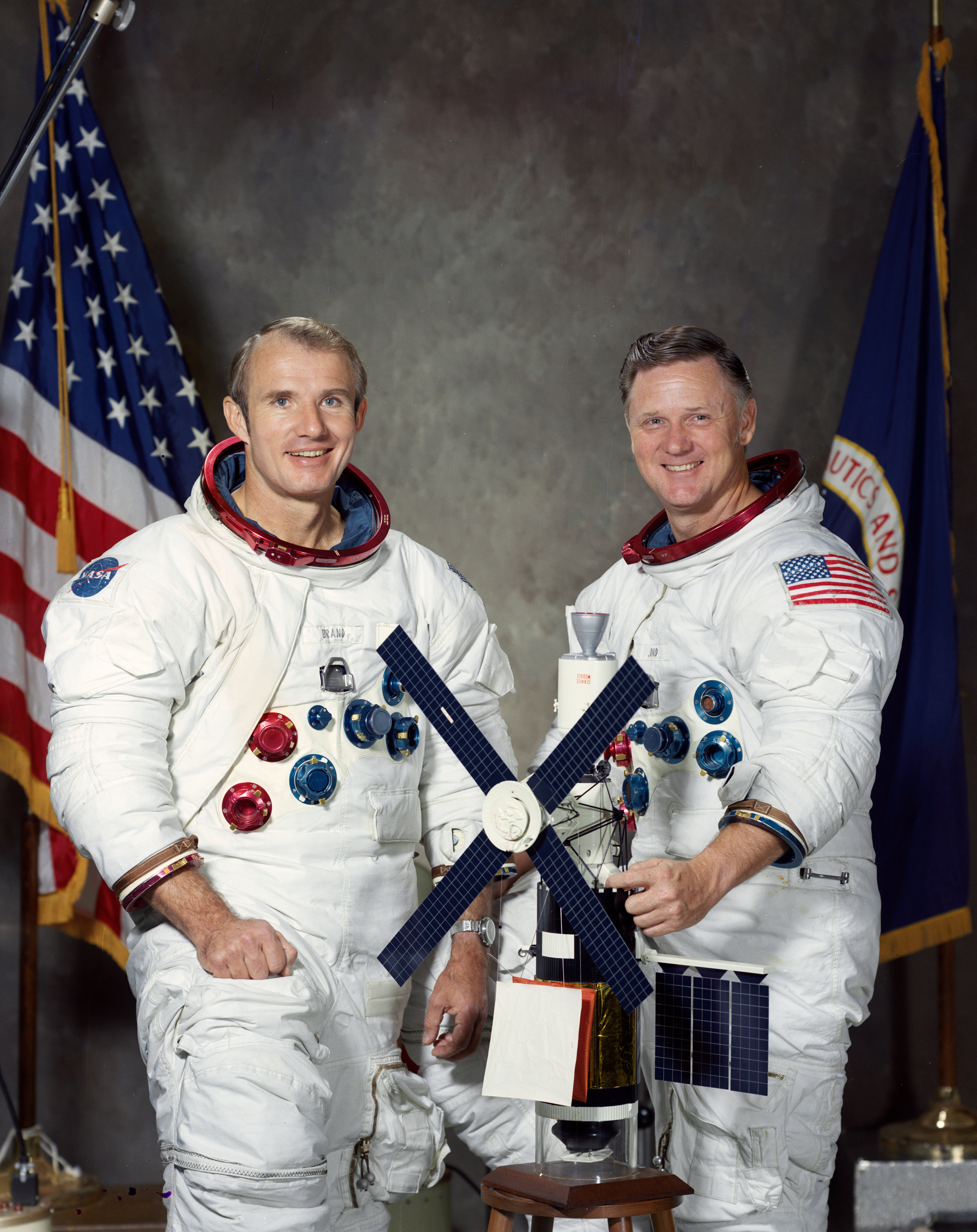
Brand (left) with Don Lind as a Skylab rescue crew

One of the 19 pilot astronauts selected by NASA in April 1966, Brand initially was a crew member in the thermal vacuum chamber testing of the prototype command module (alongside astronauts Joe Engle and Dr. Joseph Kerwin) and support crewman on Apollo 8 and Apollo 13. During the Apollo 13 crisis, Brand was CAPCOM during the PC+2 burn. Later he was backup Command Module Pilot for Apollo 15, and was likely to be named to the prime crew of Apollo 18 before that mission was canceled. Brand was backup commander for Skylabs 3 and 4. When Skylab 3's CSM had problems with its Reaction Control System, Brand was put on standby to command a rescue mission with backup Pilot Don Lind; however, the crew stood down when it was decided that the problem did not require the rescue mission to be launched. As an astronaut, he held management positions relating to spacecraft development, acquisition, flight safety and mission operations. Brand flew on four space missions; Apollo–Soyuz, STS-5, STS-41-B, and STS-35. He logged 746 hours in space and commanded three missions. Brand was the last member of his astronaut class to remain active with NASA, and was the only Apollo-era astronaut to pilot the Space Shuttle in the post-Challenger era.

Brand departed the Astronaut Office in 1992 to become Chief of Plans at the National Aerospace Plane (NASP) Joint Program Office at Wright-Patterson Air Force Base. In September 1994, he moved to California to become Assistant Chief of Flight Operations at the Dryden Flight Research Center, then Acting Chief Engineer, Deputy Director for Aerospace Projects, and Acting Associate Center Director for Programs. He retired from NASA in January 2008.

=== Apollo–Soyuz Test Project ===
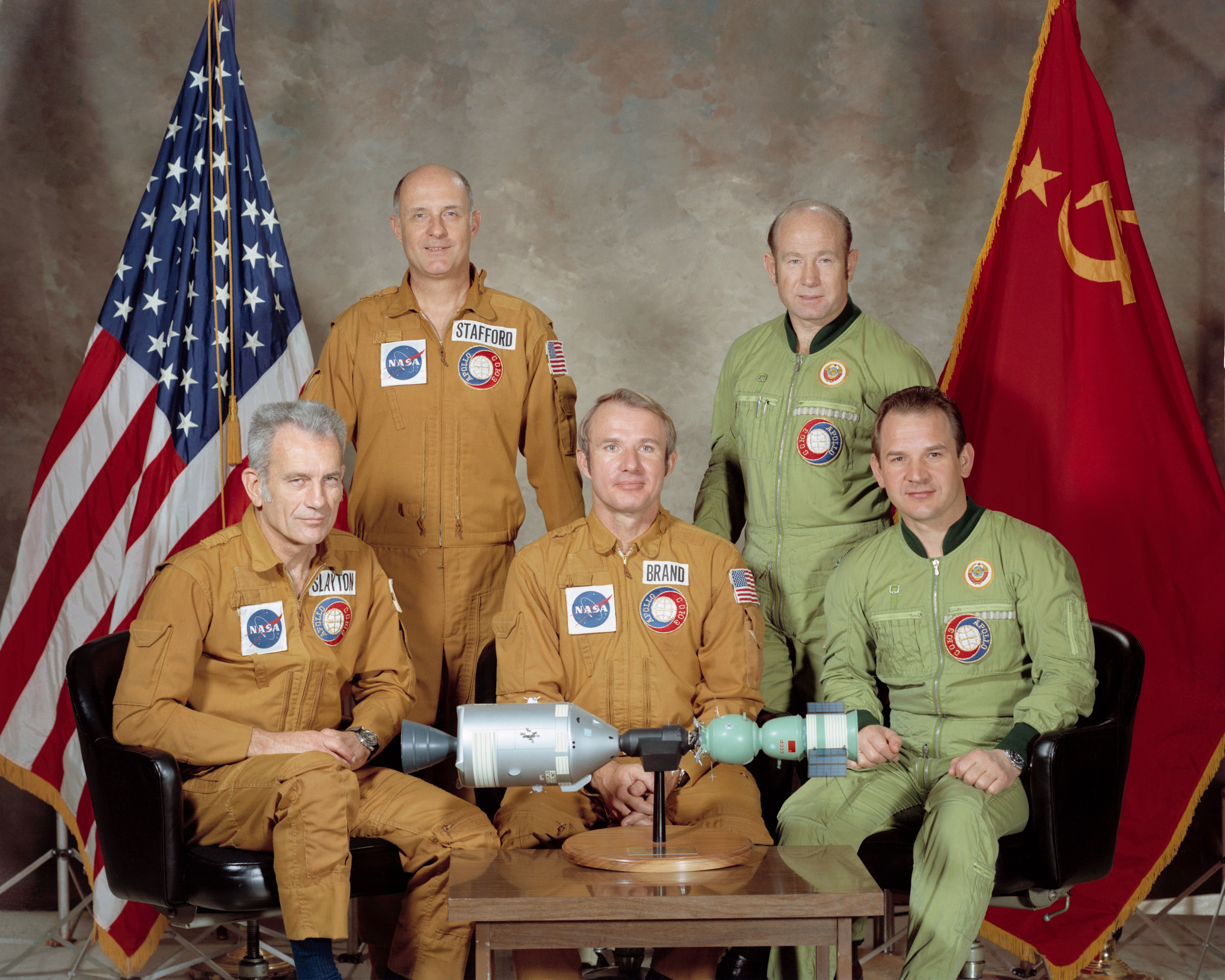
Brand (seated center) poses with the rest of the American and Soviet crew of Apollo–Soyuz

Brand was launched on his first space flight on July 15, 1975, as Apollo Command Module Pilot on the Apollo–Soyuz Test Project mission. This flight resulted in the historic meeting in space between American astronauts and Soviet cosmonauts. Other crewmen on this nine-day Earth-orbital mission were Apollo Commander Thomas Stafford, Apollo Docking Module Pilot Deke Slayton, Soyuz Commander Alexei Leonov, and Soyuz Flight Engineer Valeri Kubasov. The Soyuz spacecraft was launched at Baikonur Cosmodrome, and the Apollo was launched 7½ hours later at the Kennedy Space Center. Two days later, the two spacecraft docked successfully. The linkup tested a new docking system and demonstrated international cooperation in space. There were 44 hours of docked joint activities which included four crew transfers between the Apollo and the Soyuz. Six records for docked and group flight were set on the mission and are recognized by the Fédération Aéronautique Internationale. Apollo splashed down in the Pacific Ocean near Hawaii, on July 25, and was recovered by USS New Orleans, completing a 217-hour mission. The mission almost ended in disaster when, during the final stages of the mission, the crew was exposed to near fatal amounts of nitrogen tetroxide gas. The reaction control system had been inadvertently left on during descent, and the poisonous fumes were sucked into the capsule as it drew in outside air. Brand briefly lost consciousness and all three crewmen required hospitalization in Hawaii for a number of weeks after landing.

=== STS-5 ===
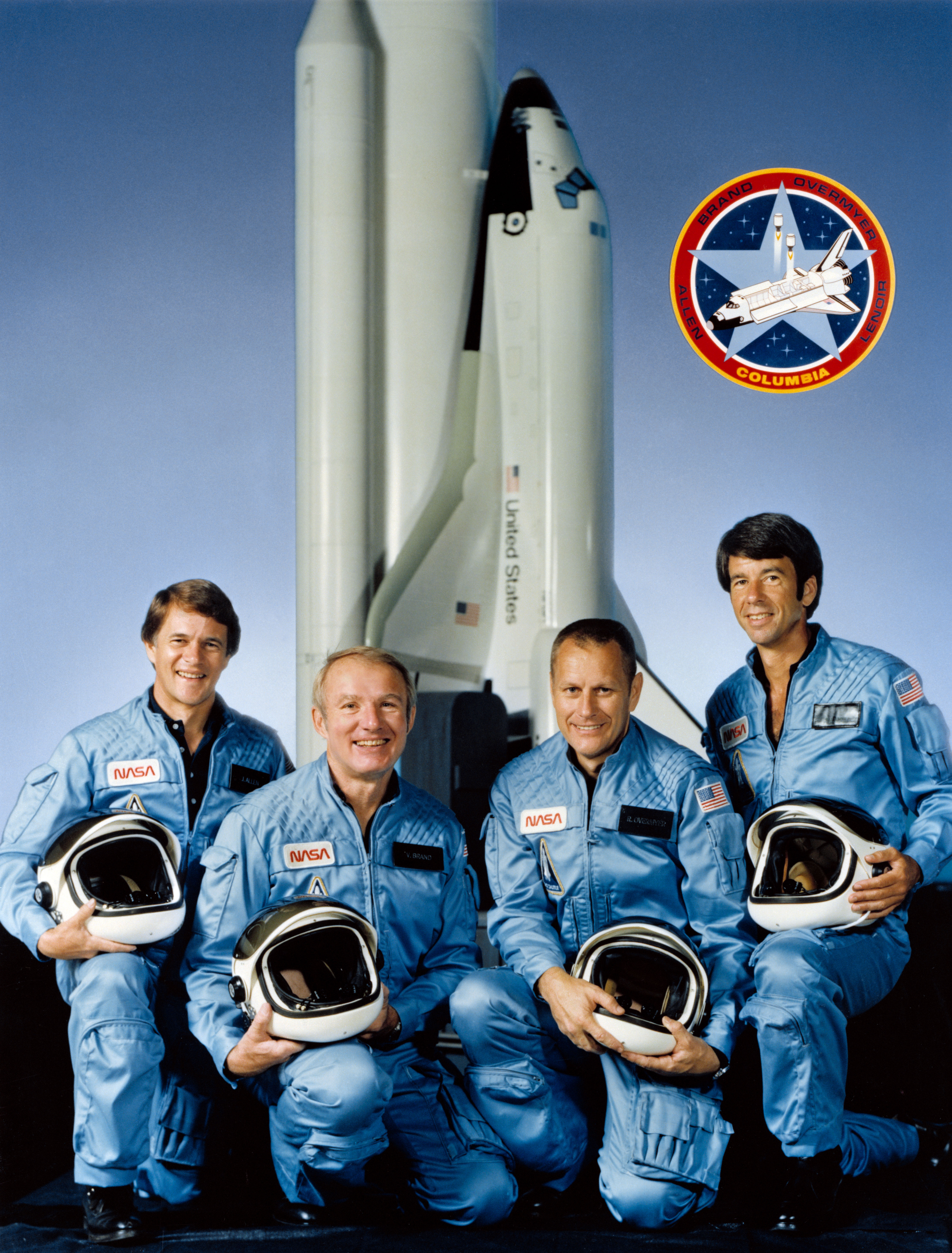
Brand (second from left) with his STS-5 crewmates

Brand was commander of Space Shuttle Columbia for STS-5, the first fully operational flight of the Space Shuttle program, which launched on November 11, 1982. His crew comprised Colonel Robert Overmyer, pilot, and two mission specialists, Dr. Joseph P. Allen and Dr. William B. Lenoir. STS-5, the first mission with a four-man crew, demonstrated the Shuttle as operational by the successful first deployment of two commercial communications satellites from the Shuttle's payload bay. The mission marked the Shuttle's first use of an upper-stage rocket for payloads, the Payload Assist Module (PAM-D). The satellites were deployed for Satellite Business Systems Corporation of McLean, Virginia, and TELESAT of Ottawa, Canada. Two FAI records for mass to altitude were set on the mission. Numerous flight tests were performed to ascertain Shuttle performance. STS-5 was the last flight to carry the Development Flight Instrumentation package to support extensive flight testing. The STS-5 crew concluded the 5-day orbital flight of Columbia with the landing approach through a cloud deck to Runway 22 at Edwards Air Force Base, California on November 16, 1982. Mission duration was 122 hours.

=== STS-41-B ===
Brand commanded Challenger with a crew of five on the tenth flight of the Space Shuttle program, STS-41-B. The launch was on February 3, 1984. His crew included Commander Robert L. Gibson, pilot, and 3 Mission Specialists, Captain Bruce McCandless II, Dr. Ronald McNair, and Lt. Col. Robert L. Stewart. The flight accomplished the deployment of two Hughes HS-376 communications satellites which failed to reach desired geosynchronous orbits due to upper-stage rocket failures. This mission marked the first flight checkout of the Manned Maneuvering Unit and the Manipulator Foot Restraint with McCandless and Stewart performing two untethered extravehicular activities. Shuttle rendezvous sensors and computer programs were flight-tested for the first time. The 8-day flight of Challenger ended with the first landing on the runway at the Kennedy Space Center on February 11, 1984.

Brand was training initially for STS-51-H on Atlantis in November 1985. That mission was canceled and re-manifested as STS-61-K, a Spacelab mission which would have launched on Columbia in October 1986. That mission was canceled by the Challenger disaster.

=== STS-35 ===
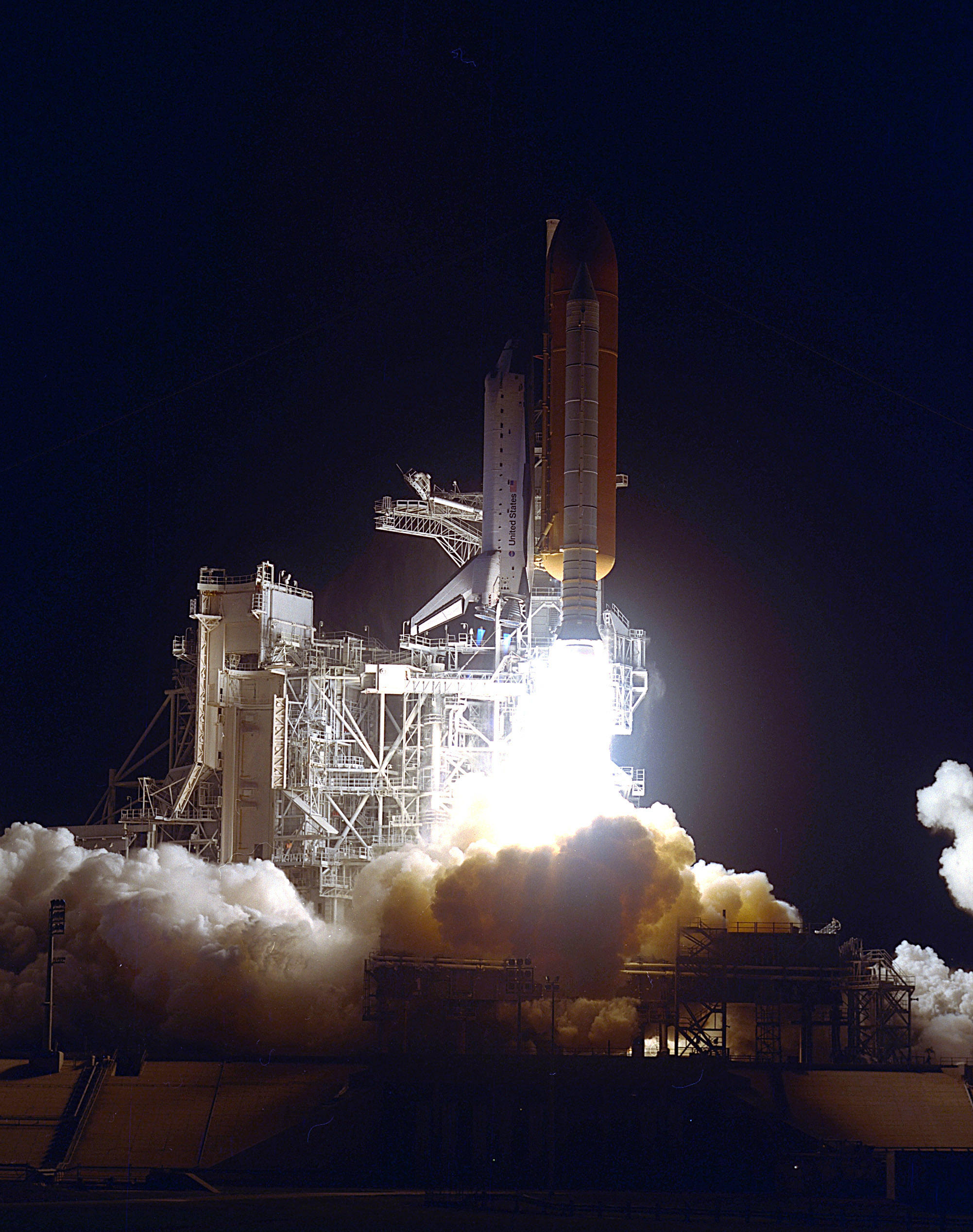
Brand heads into orbit aboard Space Shuttle Columbia, 1990

Brand again commanded Columbia on the 38th flight of the shuttle, this time with a crew of seven, on STS-35, who replaced the original commander Jon McBride in which he left NASA in 1989. The night launch on December 2, 1990, started a nine-day mission devoted to round-the-clock astronomical observations. Crewmen included the pilot, Col. Guy Gardner; three mission specialists, John M. Lounge, Dr. Robert A. Parker and Dr. Jeffrey A. Hoffman; and two payload specialists, Dr. Samuel T. Durrance and Dr. Ronald A. Parise. The 13-ton payload consisted of the three ASTRO-1 ultraviolet (UV) telescopes and the Broadband X-ray Telescope. More than 200 Orbiter maneuvers were required to point the telescopes. This Shuttle flight, one of the first dedicated to astronomy, provided a rich return of science data with emphasis on observations of very active celestial objects. A night landing was made on December 10, to Runway 22 at Edwards Air Force Base. Mission duration was 215 hours.

== Awards and honors ==
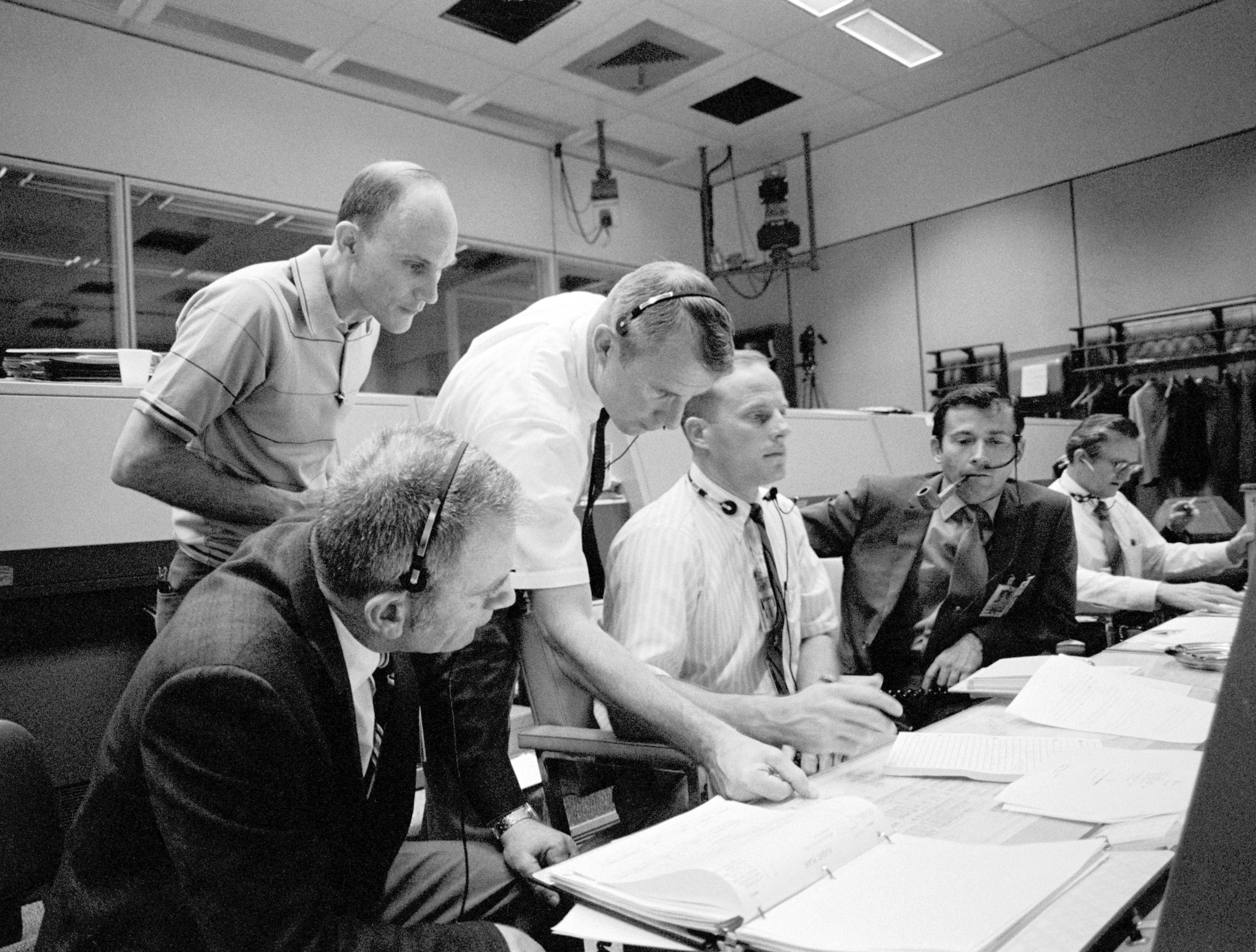
Brand (standing right) during the Apollo 13 crisis (April 1970)

- JSC Certificate of Commendation (1970)
- Two NASA Distinguished Service Medals (1975 & 1992)
- Two NASA Exceptional Service Medals (1974 & 1988)
- Zeta Beta Tau's Richard Gottheil Medal (1975)
- Wright Brothers International Manned Space Flight Award (1975)
- two VFW National Space Award (1976 & 1984)
- Sigma Nu Distinguished Alumnus of the Year Award (1976)
- University of Colorado Alumnus of the Century (1 of 12) (1976)
- AIAA Special Presidential Citation (1977)
- two American Astronautical Society's Flight Achievement Award for 1976
- AIAA Haley Astronautics Award (1978)
- JSC Special Achievement Award (1978)
- Harmon Trophy (Astronaut) (1993)
- FAI De la Vaulx Medal (1983)
- Three NASA Space Flight Medals (1983, 1984, 1992)
- Distinguished Visiting Lecturer at University of Colorado (1984)
- Vance Brand Airport in Longmont, CO named in his honor (1988)
- De Molay Hall of Honor (1989)
- two FAI V. M. Komarov Diplomas (1983 & 1991)
- University of Colorado George Norlin Award (1991)
- De Molay Legion of Honor (1993)
- International Space Hall of Fame (1996)
- U.S. Astronaut Hall of Fame (1997)
- Meritorious Executive, U.S. Senior Executive Service (1997)
- Honorary Doctor of Science degree from University of Colorado (2000)
- International Aerospace Hall of Fame (2001)
- Oklahoma Aviation and Space Hall of Fame (2005)
- Tsiolkovsky Gold Medal of the International Aeronautical Federation (2005)
- ASE Crystal Helmet Award (2005)
- Sigma Nu Hall of Fame (2010)
- Honorary Citizen of Kaliningrad
- DeMolay International Hall of Fame

== Personal life ==
Brand is married to the former Beverly Ann Whitnel and has two daughters and four sons: Susan Nancy (born April 30, 1954), Stephanie Brand Lowery (born August 6, 1955), Patrick Richard (born March 22, 1958), Kevin Stephen (born December 1, 1963), Erik Ryan (May 11, 1981), and Dane Vance (born October 1, 1985). He currently resides with his wife in Tehachapi, California.

=== Philanthropy ===
In 2019, Brand donated 40 acres of land to the Rocky Mountain Conservancy, which is the nonprofit arm of Rocky Mountain National Park, hoping to expand the national park that he has visited throughout his life. He had purchased the land in 1967. The 40 acres of rugged terrain, located near Estes Cone and roughly 4 miles from Longs Peak, borders Rocky Mountain National Park on two sides. The United States Congress will need to approve the boundary change for this acreage to be officially incorporated into the national park.

== See also ==
- Apollo–Soyuz Commemorative stamp
- List of spaceflight records
- The Astronaut Monument
