= Skylab 3 =

Second crewed mission to Skylab

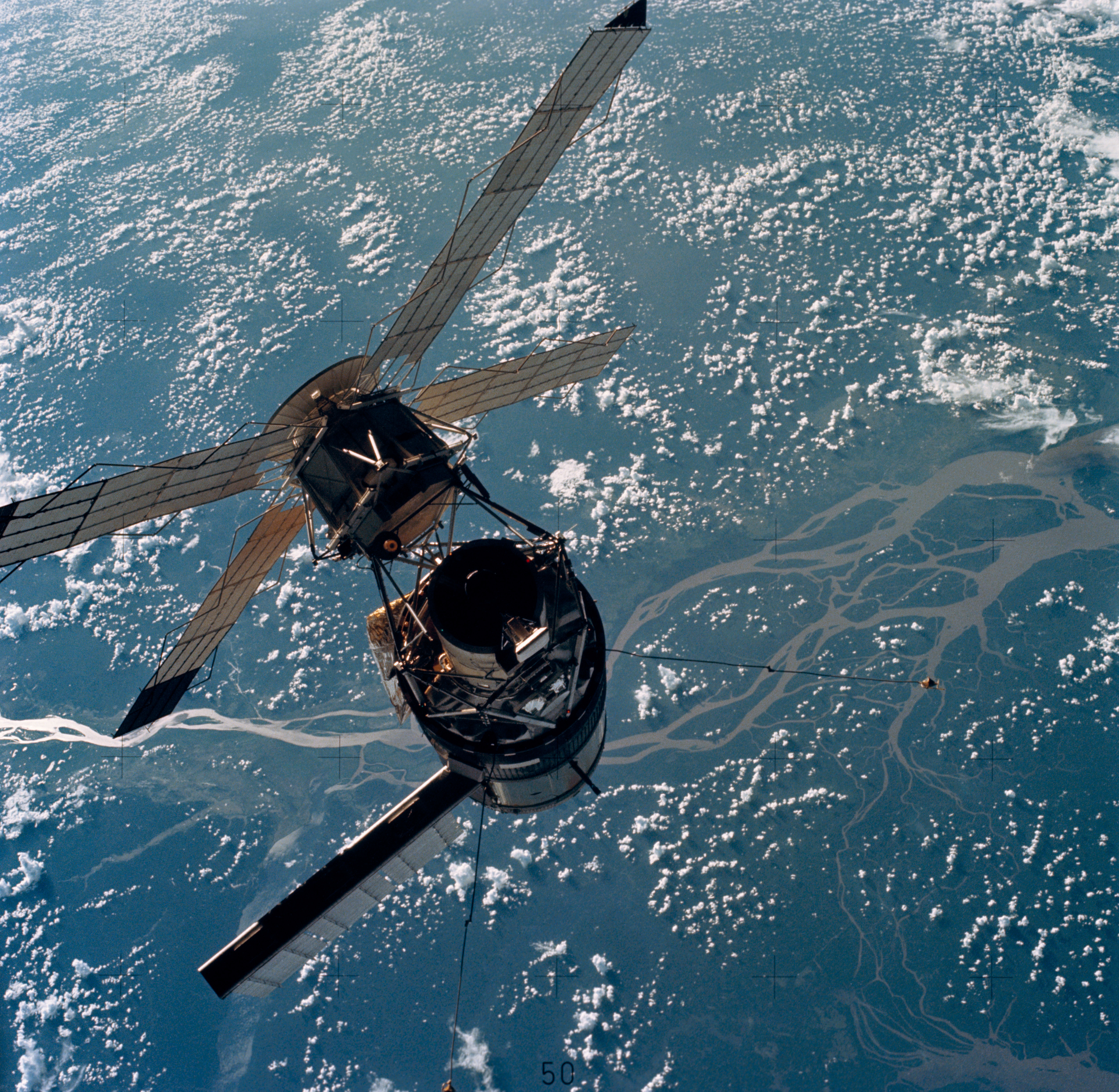
- Skylab as seen by the arriving Skylab 3 crew
- Operator: NASA
- COSPAR ID: 1973-050A
- SATCAT no.: 6757
- Mission duration: 59 days, 11 hours, 09 minutes, 01 seconds
- Distance travelled: 39,400,000 kilometers (24,500,000 mi)
- Orbits completed: 858

Spacecraft properties
- Spacecraft: Apollo CSM-117
- Manufacturer: North American Rockwell
- Launch mass: 20,121 kilograms (44,359 lb)

Crew
- Crew size: 3
- Members: Alan L. Bean; Owen K. Garriott; Jack R. Lousma

Start of mission
- Launch date: July 28, 1973, 11:11:00 UTC
- Rocket: Saturn IB SA-207
- Launch site: Kennedy LC-39B

End of mission
- Recovered by: USS New Orleans
- Landing date: September 25, 1973, 22:19:51 UTC
- Landing site: 30°47′N 120°29′W

Orbital parameters
- Reference system: Geocentric
- Regime: Low Earth
- Perigee altitude: 423 kilometers (263 mi)
- Apogee altitude: 441 kilometers (274 mi)
- Inclination: 50.0 degrees
- Period: 93.2 minutes
- Epoch: August 8, 1973

Docking with Skylab
- Docking port: Forward
- Docking date: July 28, 1973, 19:37:00 UTC
- Undocking date: September 25, 1973, 11:16:42 UTC
- Time docked: 58 days, 15 hours, 39 minutes, 42 seconds
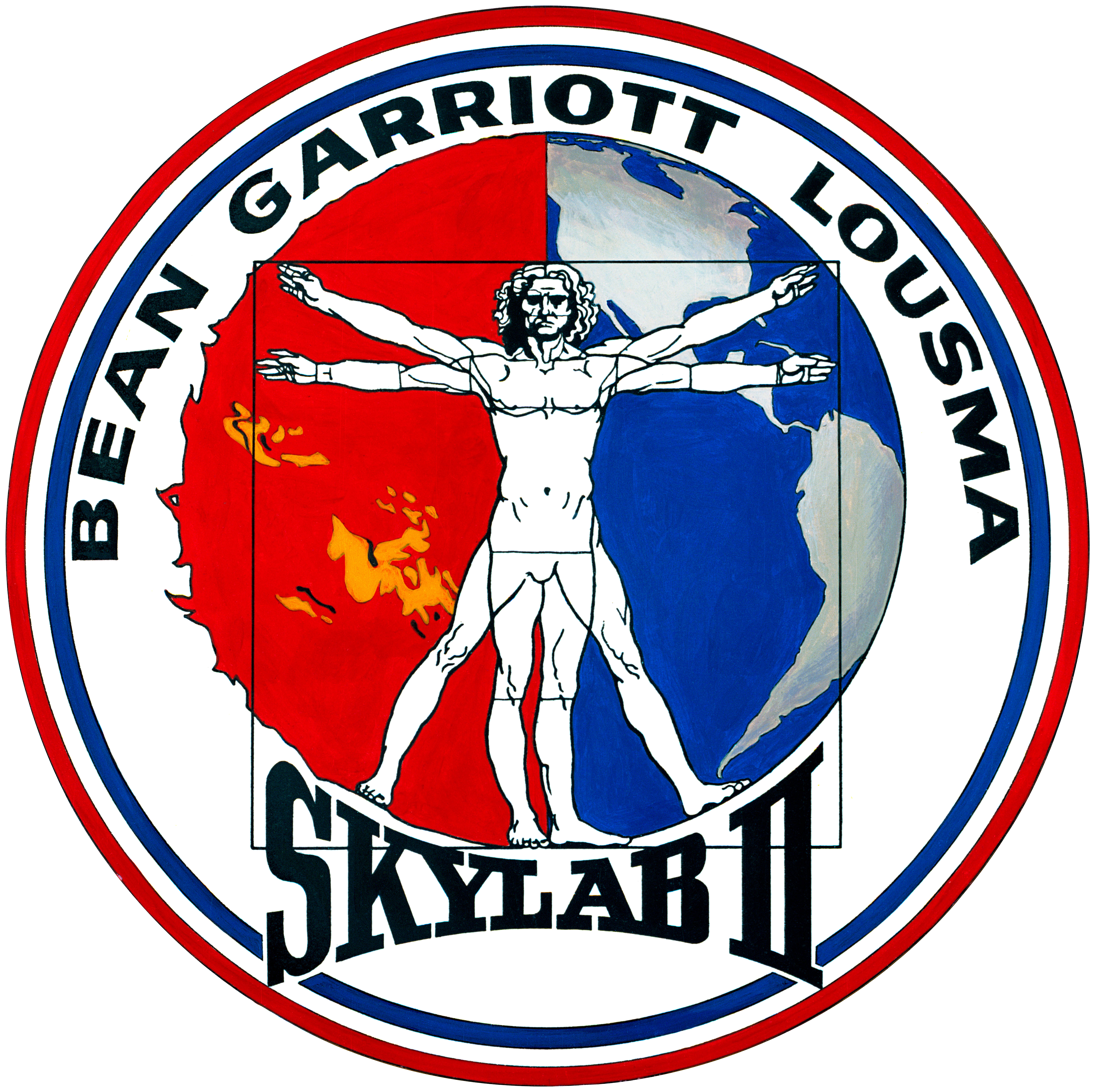
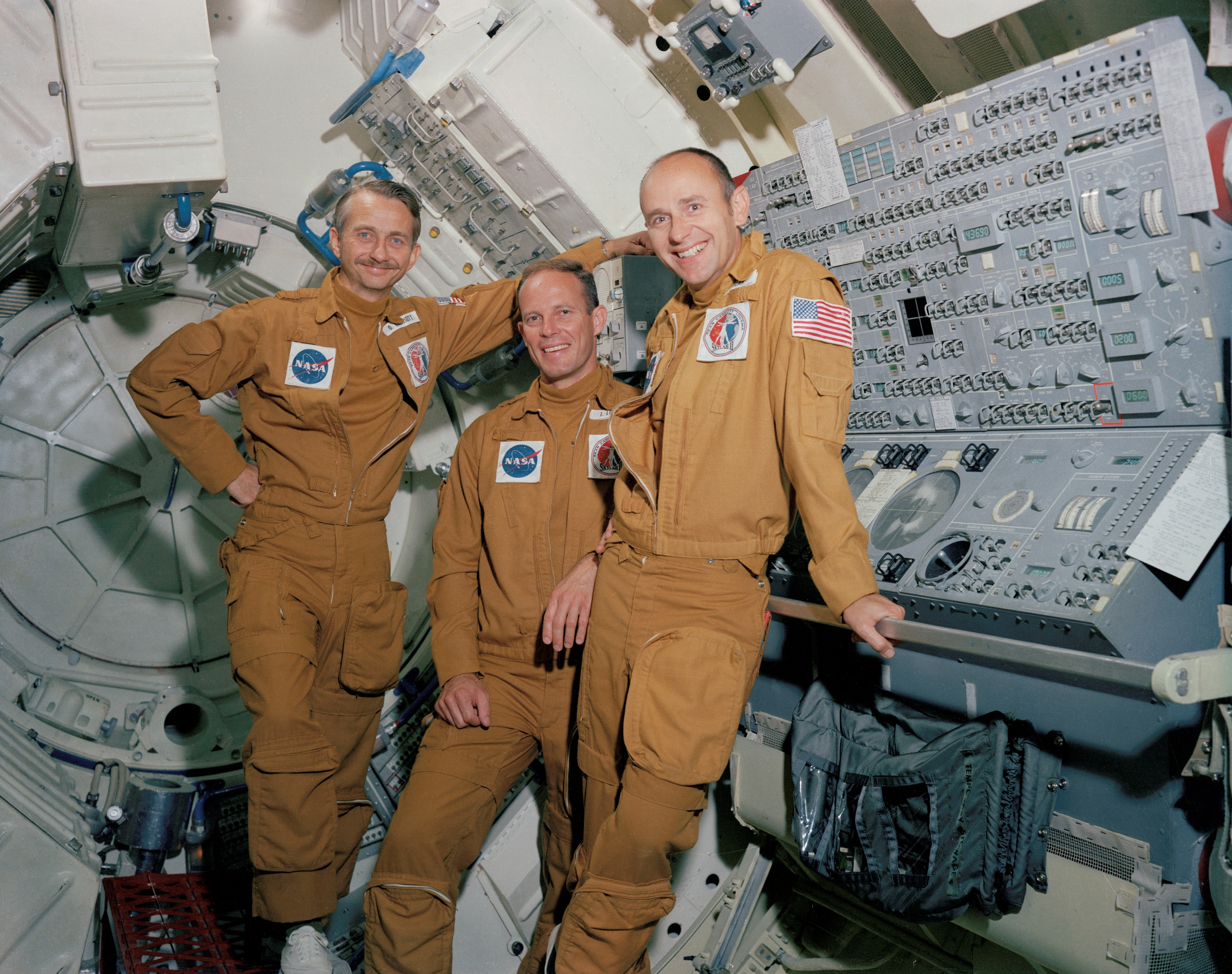
- Due to a NASA management error, crewed Skylab mission patches were designed in conflict with the official mission numbering scheme. L-R: Garriott, Lousma and Bean Skylab program

Skylab 3 (also SL-3 and SLM-2) was the second crewed mission to the first American space station, Skylab. The mission began on July 28, 1973, with the launch of NASA astronauts Alan Bean, Owen Garriott, and Jack Lousma in the Apollo command and service module on the Saturn IB rocket, and lasted 59 days, 11 hours and 9 minutes. A total of 1,084.7 astronaut-utilization hours were tallied by the Skylab 3 crew performing scientific experiments in the areas of medical activities, solar observations, Earth resources, and other experiments.

The crewed Skylab missions were officially designated Skylab 2, 3, and 4. Miscommunication about the numbering resulted in the mission emblems reading "Skylab I", "Skylab II", and "Skylab 3" respectively.

== Crew ==
Position	Astronaut
Commander	Alan L. Bean; Second and last spaceflight
Science Pilot	Owen K. Garriott; First spaceflight
Pilot	Jack R. Lousma; First spaceflight

=== Backup crew ===
Position	Astronaut
Commander	Vance D. Brand
Science Pilot	William B. Lenoir
Pilot	Don L. Lind

=== Support crew ===
- Robert L. Crippen
- Henry W. Hartsfield Jr
- Karl G. Henize
- F. Story Musgrave
- William E. Thornton
- Richard H. Truly

== Mission parameters ==
Days in Space
Mission
Skylab 2	28
Skylab 3	60
Skylab 4	84

- Mass: about 20,121 kg (44,359 lb)
- Maximum Altitude: 440 km
- Distance: 24.5 million miles (39.4 million km)
- Launch Vehicle: Saturn IB SA-207
- Spacecraft: Apollo CSM-117
- Perigee: 423 km
- Apogee: 441 km
- Inclination: 50°
- Period: 93.2 min

=== Docking ===
- Docked: July 28, 1973 – 19:37:00 UTC
- Undocked: September 25, 1973 – 11:16:42 UTC
- Time Docked: 58 days, 15 hours, 39 minutes, 42 seconds

=== Space walks ===
Garriott and Lousma – EVA 1
Start: August 6, 1973, 17:30 UTC
End: August 6, 23:59 UTC
Duration: 6 hours, 29 minutes
Garriott and Lousma – EVA 2
Start: August 24, 1973, 16:24 UTC
End: August 24, 20:54 UTC
Duration: 4 hours, 30 minutes
Bean and Garriott – EVA 3
Start: September 22, 1973, 11:18 UTC
End: September 22, 14:03 UTC
Duration: 2 hours, 45 minutes

== Mission highlights ==
Days in space
Mission
Skylab 2	28
Skylab 3	60
Skylab 4	84

While approaching Skylab a propellant leak developed in one of the Apollo Service Module's reaction control system thruster quads. The crew was able to safely dock with the station, but troubleshooting continued with the problem. Six days later, another thruster quad developed a leak, creating concern amongst Mission Control. For the first time, an Apollo spacecraft was rolled out to Launch Complex 39 for Skylab Rescue, made possible by the ability for the station to have two Apollo CSMs docked at the same time. It was eventually determined that the CSM could be safely maneuvered using only two working thruster quads, and the rescue mission was never launched.

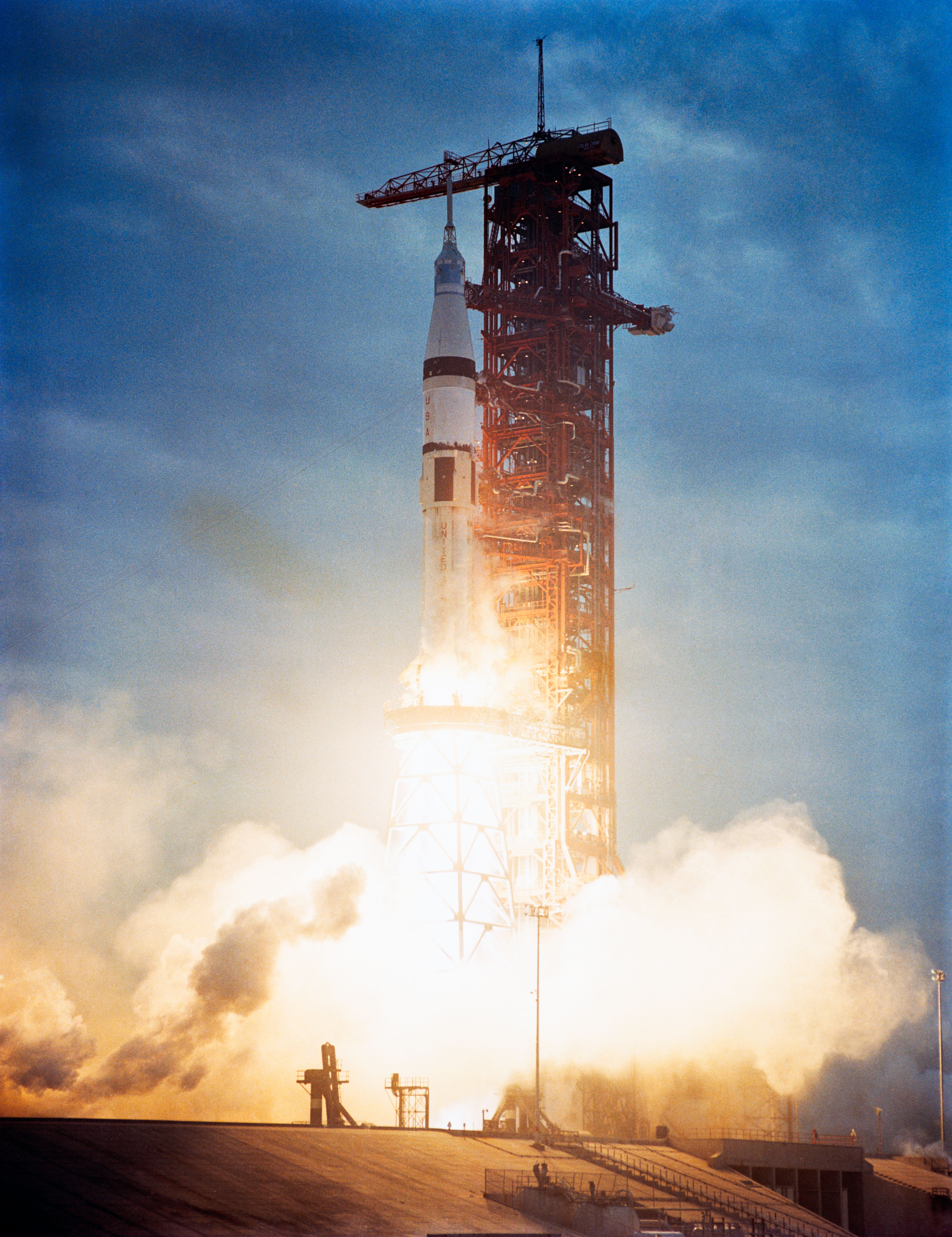
Skylab 3 heads into orbit aboard a Saturn IB.

After recovering from space sickness the crew, during their first EVA, installed the twin-pole sunshade, one of the two solutions for the destruction of the micrometeoroid shield during Skylab's launch to keep the space station cool. It was installed over the parasol, which was originally deployed through a porthole airlock during Skylab 2. Both were brought to the station by Skylab 2.

Skylab 3 continued a comprehensive medical research program that extended the data on human physiological adaptation and readaptation to space flight collected on the previous Skylab 2 mission. In addition, Skylab 3 extended the astronauts' stay in space from approximately one month to two months. Therefore, the effects of flight duration on physiological adaptation and readaptation could be examined.

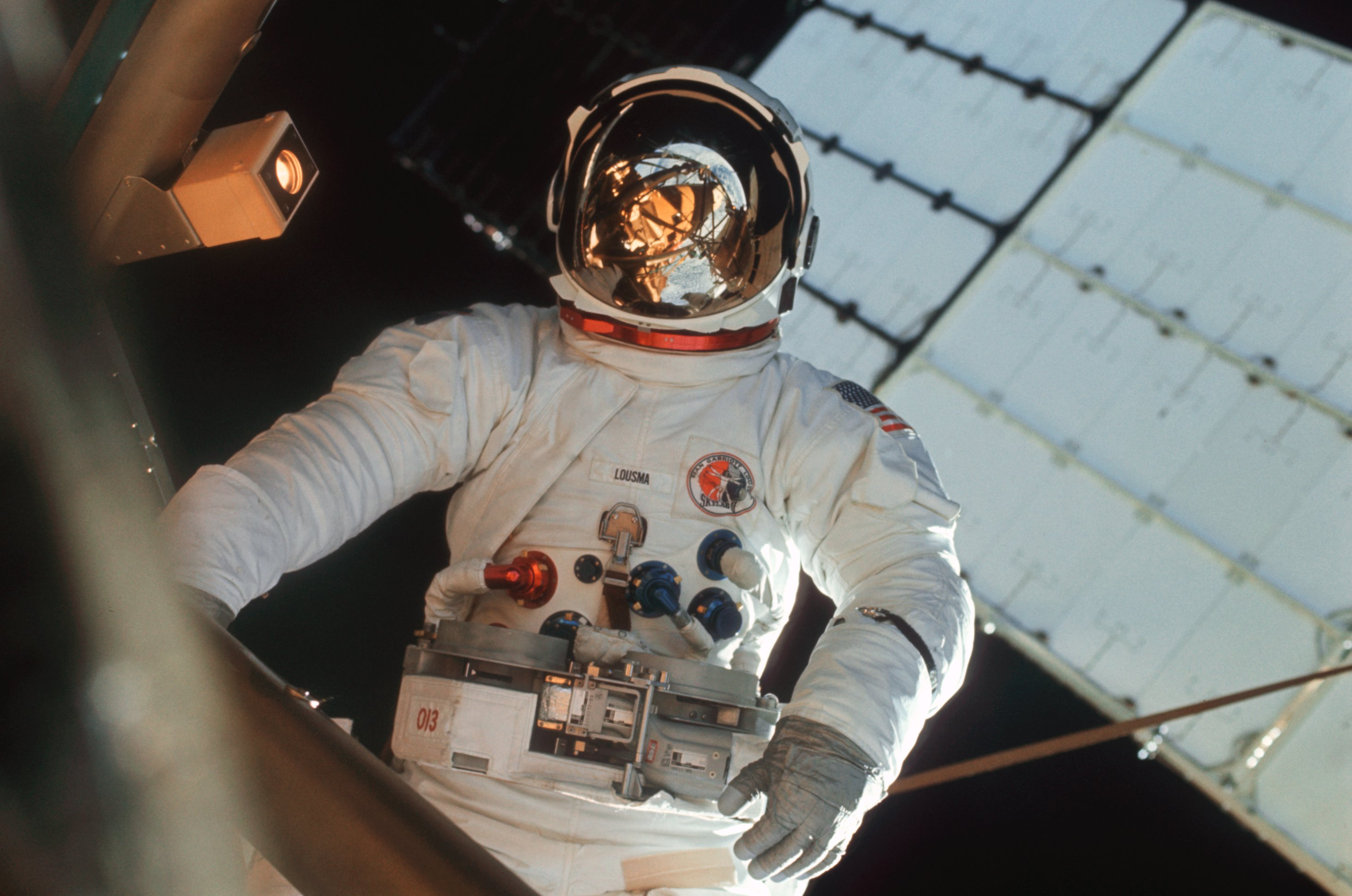
Astronaut Jack Lousma participates in an EVA.

A set of core medical investigations were performed on all three Skylab crewed missions. These core investigations were the same basic investigations that were performed on Skylab 2, except that the Skylab 3 inflight tests were supplemented with extra tests based on what researchers learned from the Skylab 2 science results. For example, only leg volume measurements, preflight and postflight stereophotogrammetry, and in-flight maximum calf girth measurements were originally scheduled for all three Skylab missions.

In-flight photographs from Skylab 2 revealed the "puffy face syndrome" which prompted the addition of in-flight torso and limb girth measurements to gather more data on the apparent headward fluid shift on Skylab 3. Other additional tests included arterial blood flow measurements by an occlusive cuff placed around the leg, facial photographs taken before flight and during flight to study the "puffy face syndrome", venous compliance, hemoglobin, urine specific gravity, and urine mass measurements. These inflight tests gave additional information about fluid distribution and fluid balance to get a better understanding of the fluid shift phenomena.

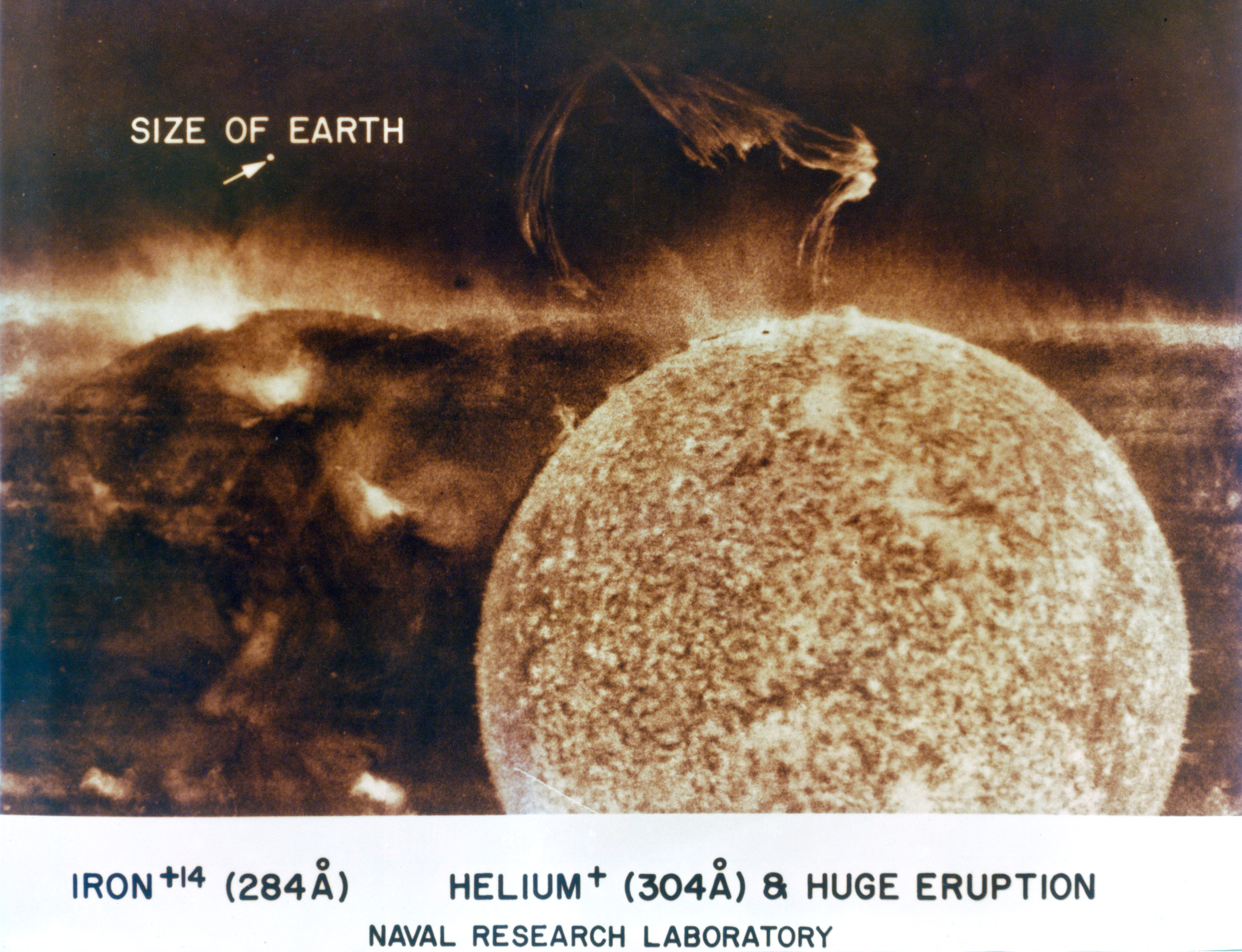
An extreme ultraviolet view of the Sun (the Apollo Telescope Mount SO82A Experiment) taken during Skylab 3, with the Earth added for scale. On the right an image of the Sun shows a helium emissions, and there is an image on the left showing emissions from iron.

The Skylab 3 biological experiments studied the effects of microgravity on mice, fruit flies, single cells and cell culture media. Human lung cells were flown to examine the biochemical characteristics of cell cultures in the microgravity environment. The two animal experiments involved the chronobiology of little pocket mice and circadian rhythm in vinegar gnats. Both experiments were unsuccessful due to a power failure 30 hours after launch, which killed the animals.

High school students from across the United States participated in the Skylab missions as the primary investigators of experiments that studied astronomy, physics, and fundamental biology. The student experiments performed on Skylab 3 included the study of libration clouds, X-rays from Jupiter, in-vitro immunology, spider web formation, cytoplasmic streaming, mass measurement, and neutron analysis.

The crew's health was assessed on Skylab by collecting data on dental health, environmental and crew microbiology, radiation, and toxicological aspects of the Skylab orbital workshop. Other assessments were made of astronaut maneuvering equipment and of the habitability of the crew quarters, and crew activities/maintenance experiments were examined on Skylab 2 through 4 to better understand the living and working aspects of life in space.

== S150 Galactic X-Ray Mapping ==
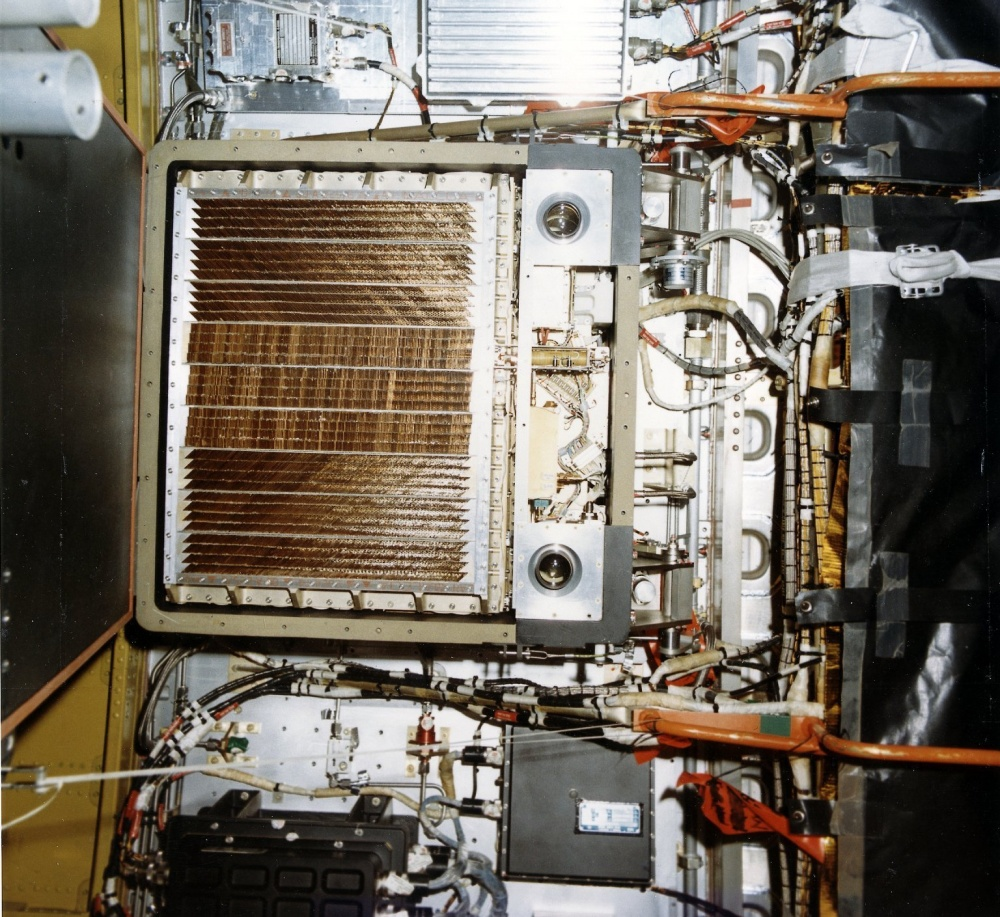
S150 instrument for galactic X-Ray mapping, sent up with Skylab 3

The S150 X-ray experiment was sent up with Skylab 3. The 1,360 kg X-ray astronomy satellite experiment was designed to look for soft galactic x-rays. Short missions had been done before, and S150 would be a longer project. S150 had a large soft x-ray detector, and was mounted atop the Saturn S-IVB upper stage. When released, S150 flew behind and below Skylab on 28 July 1973. The S150 experiment deployed after the Apollo capsule separated from the S-IVB stage. S150 had its own protective housing for the flight. The experiment on S150 ran for 5 hours, as its batteries allowed S150 to measure half of the sky. Experiment data was recorded on tape recorder and sent to ground stations when available. S150 was designed by University of Wisconsin scientists Dr. William L. Kraushaar and Alan Bunner. S150 could detect 40–100 angstrom photons.

== Spider web experiment ==
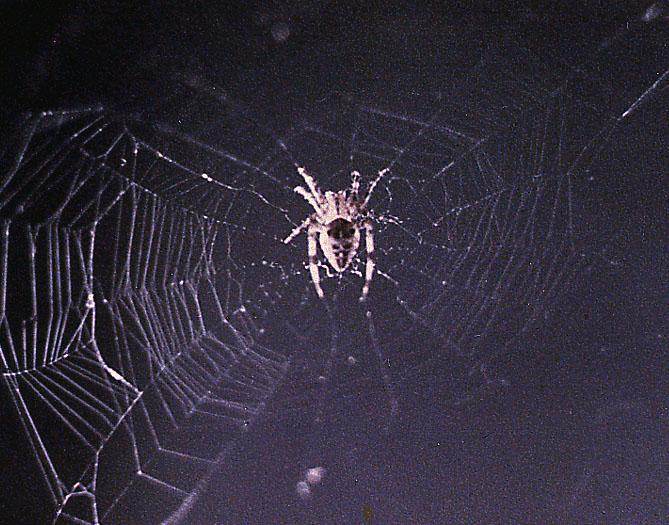
The first web spun by the spider Arabella in orbit

Spider webs were spun by two female European garden spiders (cross spiders) called Arabella and Anita, as part of an experiment on Skylab 3. The aim of the experiment was to test whether the two spiders would spin webs in space, and, if so, whether these webs would be the same as those that spiders produced on Earth. The experiment was a student project of Judy Miles of Lexington, Massachusetts. After the launch the spiders were released by astronaut Owen Garriott into a box that resembled a window frame. The spiders proceeded to construct their web while a camera took photographs and examined the spiders' behavior in a zero-gravity environment. Both spiders took a long time to adapt to their weightless existence. However, after a day, Arabella spun the first web in the experimental cage, although it was initially incomplete.

The web was completed the following day. The crew members were prompted to expand the initial protocol. They fed and watered the spiders, giving them a house fly. The first web was removed on August 13 to allow Arabella to construct a second web. At first, she failed to construct a new web. When given more water, she built a second web. This time, it was more elaborate than the first. Both spiders died during the mission, possibly from dehydration.

When scientists studied the webs they discovered that the space webs were finer than normal Earth webs, and although the patterns of the web were not totally dissimilar, variations were spotted, and there was a definite difference in the characteristics of the web. The webs were finer overall, and the space web had variations in thickness. This was unusual, because Earth webs have been observed to have uniform thickness.

Later experiments indicated that having a light source could orient the spiders and enable them to build their normal asymmetric webs when gravity was not a factor.

== Splashdown ==
The Skylab 3 mission returned to Earth with a splashdown in the Pacific Ocean at 22:20 UTC on September 25, 1973. The crew and command module were recovered by USS New Orleans, about 360 km (225 mi) off the Californian coast, southwest of San Diego. At the time, the crew held several space endurance records including: most time in space at 59 days, 11 hours, and 9 minutes; as well as holding the most orbits of the Earth, by a crew, at 858. This was the last Skylab splashdown to be covered live by American broadcast television news media, as Skylab 4's splashdown was not covered.

== Mission insignia ==
The circular crew patch was Leonardo da Vinci's c. 1490 Vitruvian Man, representing the mission's medical experiments and retouched to remove the genitalia. In the background is a disk that is half Sun (including sunspots) and half Earth to represent the experiments done on the flight. The patch has a white background, the crew's names and "Skylab II" with a red, white and blue border. The wives of the crew secretly had an alternate graphic made of a 'universal woman' with their first names in place of the crew's. Stickers with this on them were put in lockers aboard the Command Module to surprise the crew.

== Spacecraft location ==
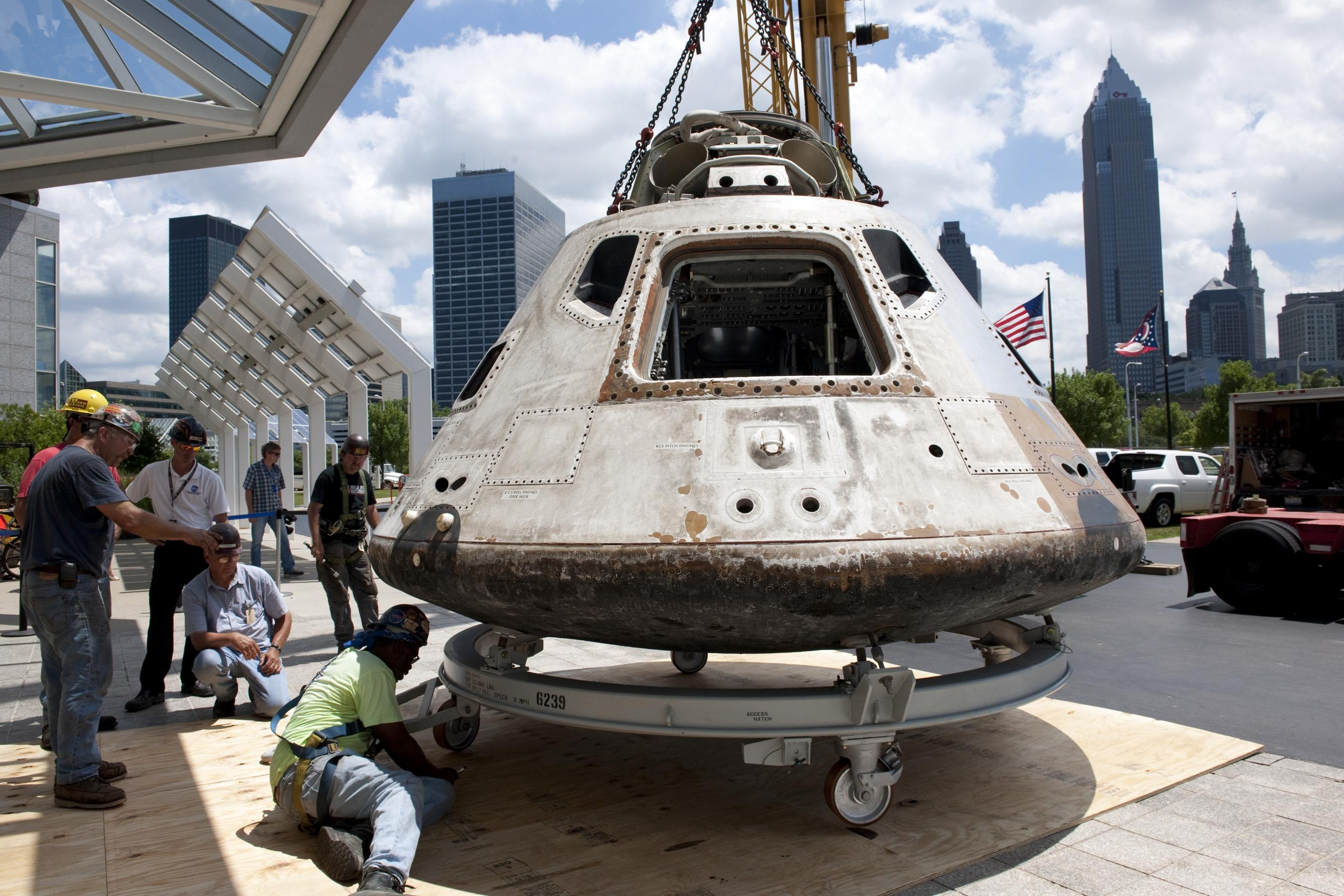
The Skylab 3 Command Module being moved to the Great Lakes Science Center

In 1977 the command module was transferred to the Smithsonian Institution by NASA. The command module was moved to the Great Lakes Science Center in Cleveland, Ohio, in June 2010. It took a year to plan and US$120,000 to move the capsule. It is currently on display at the visitor center of the NASA Glenn Research Center at the science center.

Unlike earlier Apollo modules, Skylab ones had white paint on the sunward side to help with spacecraft thermal management.

== Gallery ==
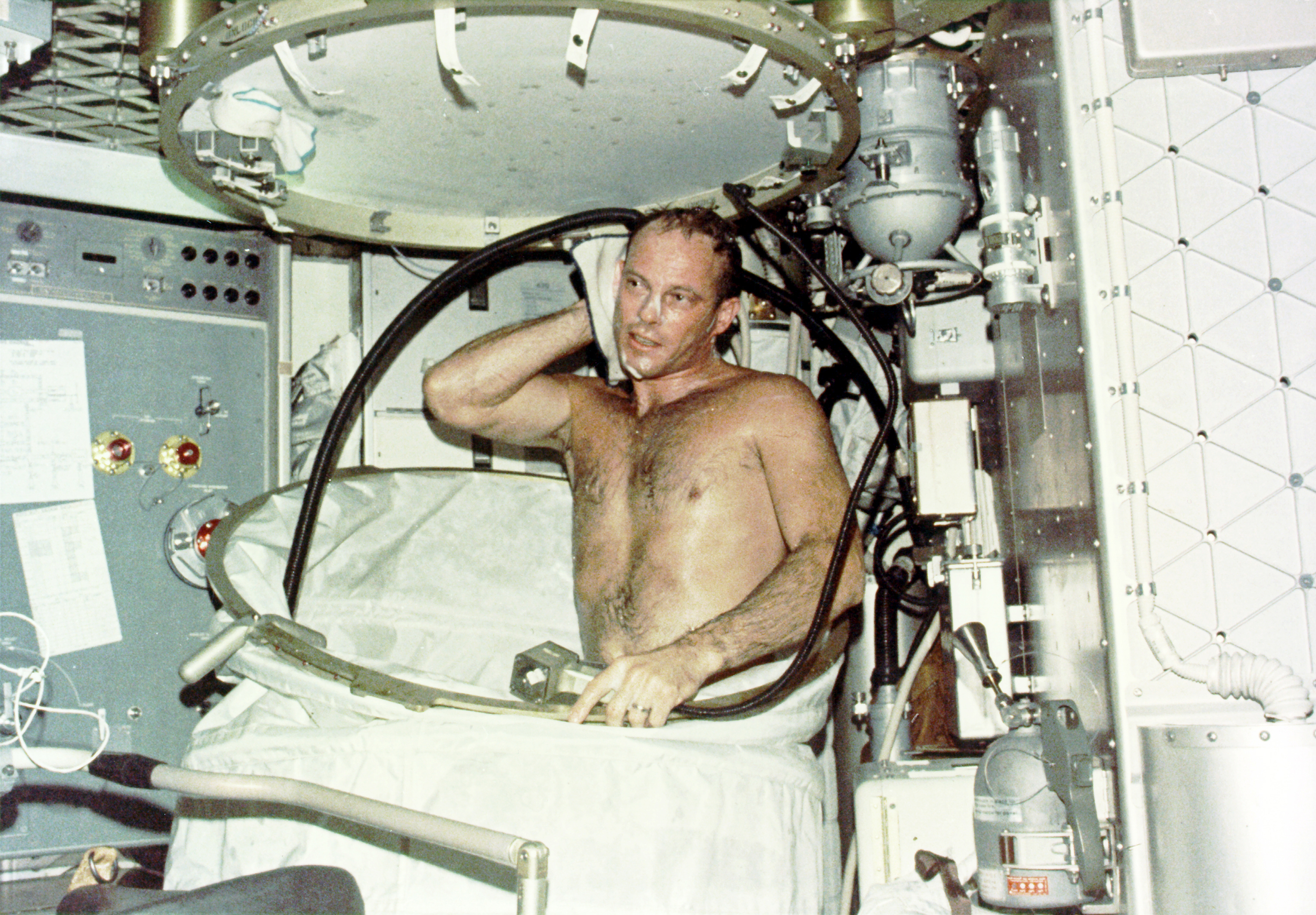
Jack Lousma takes a shower in the station's living quarters.

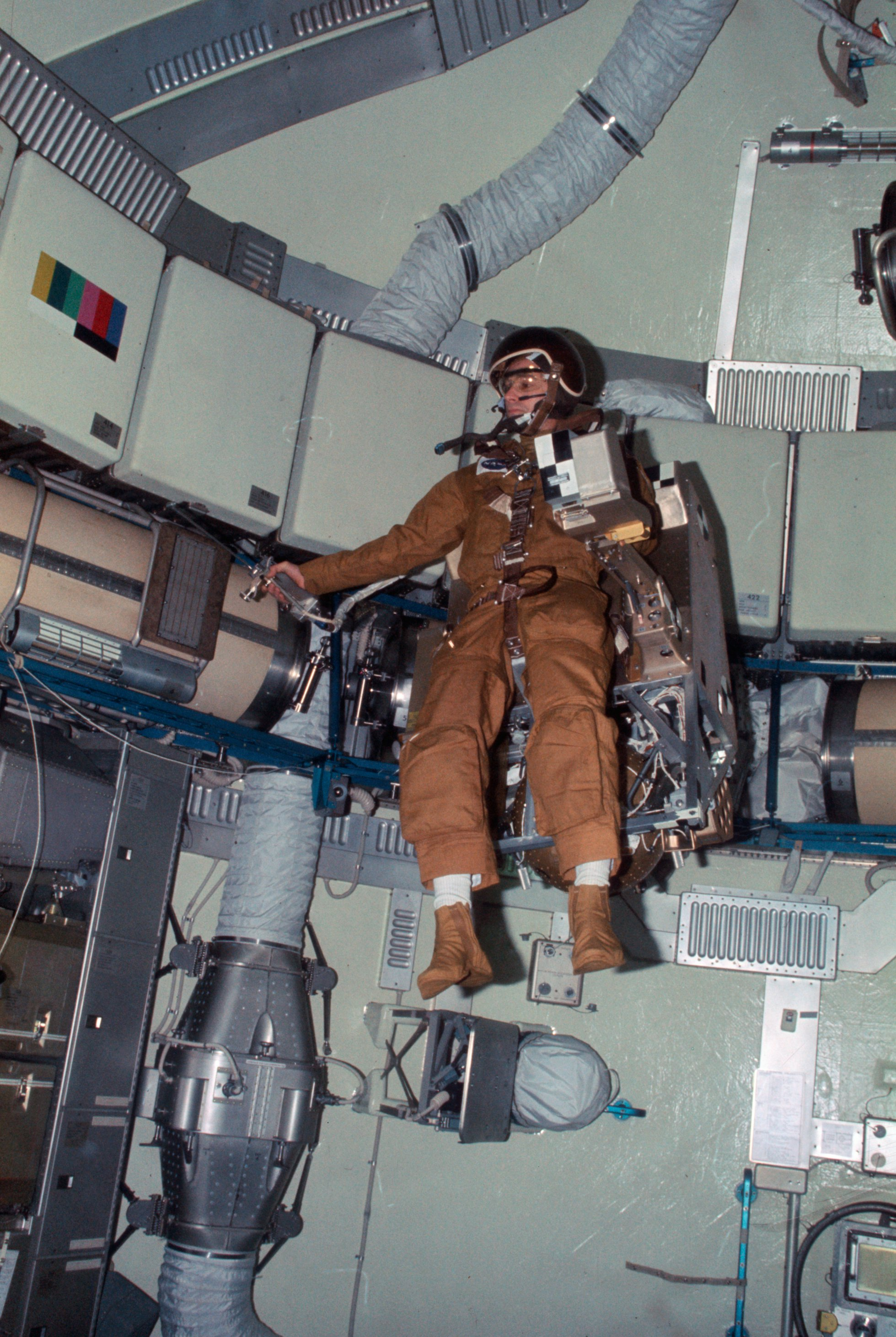
Alan Bean flies a prototype of the Manned Maneuvering Unit.

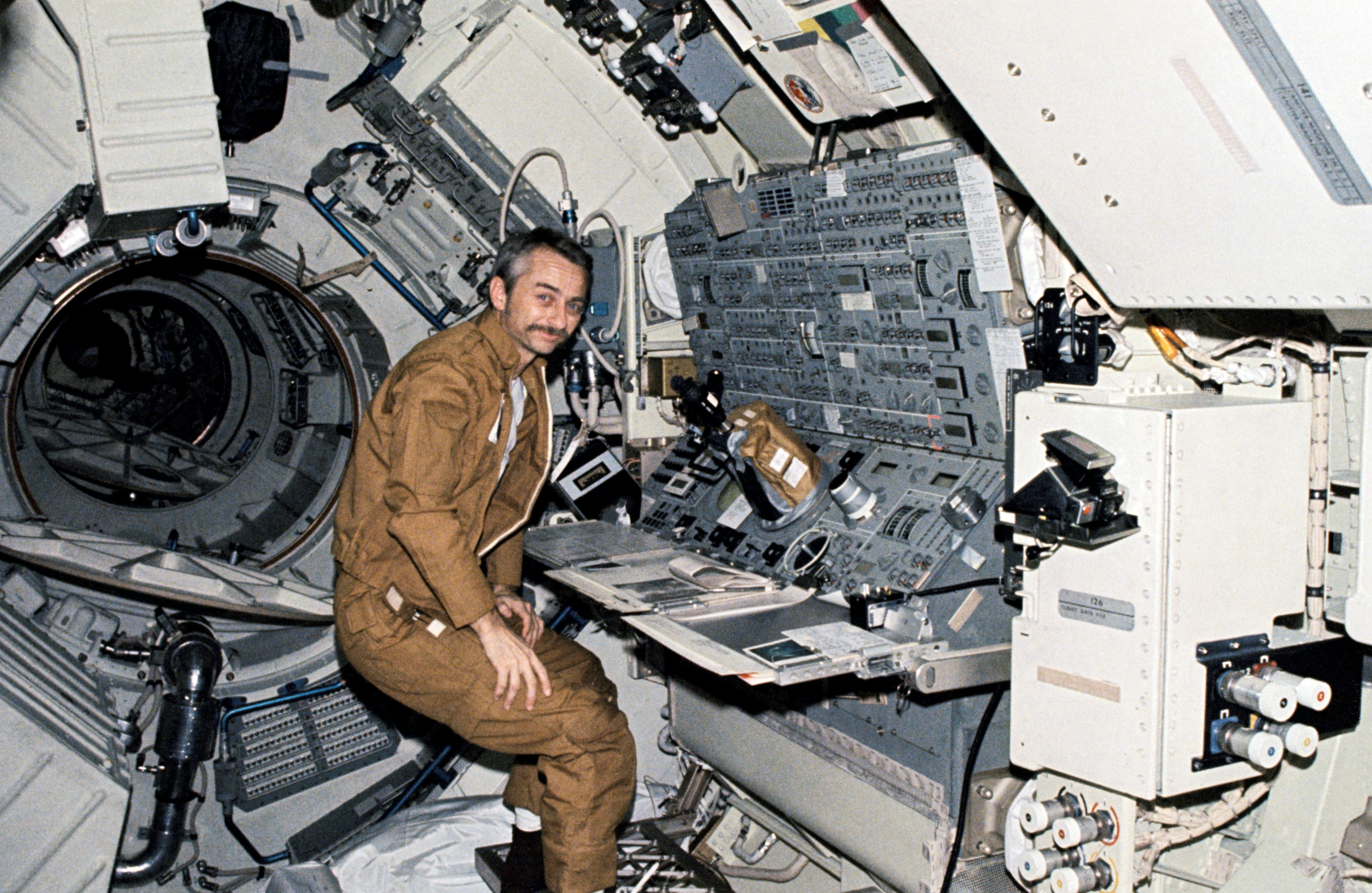
Owen Garriott operating the Apollo Telescope Mount

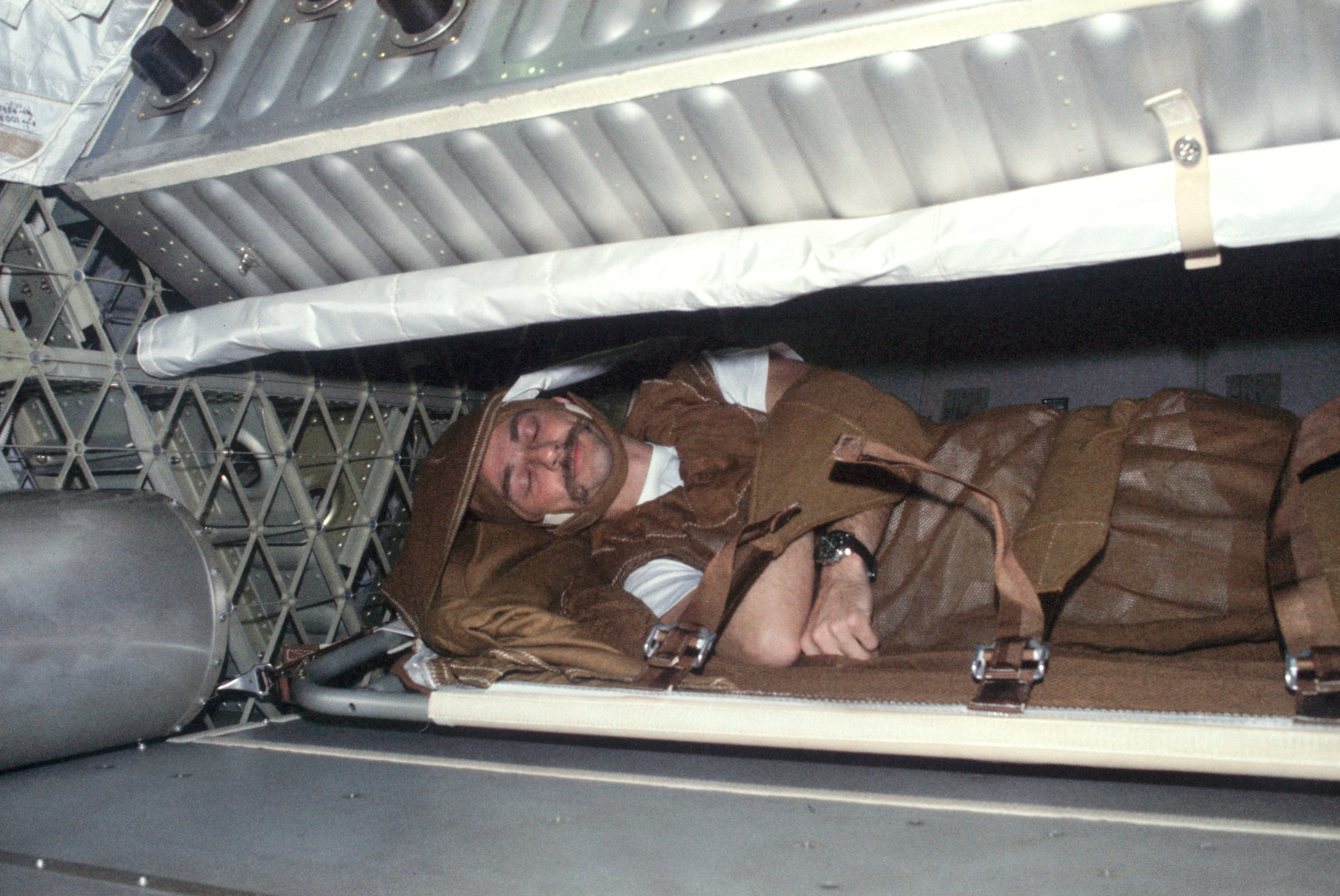
Garriott sleeps in his quarters, held down with straps to keep him secure in zero-G.

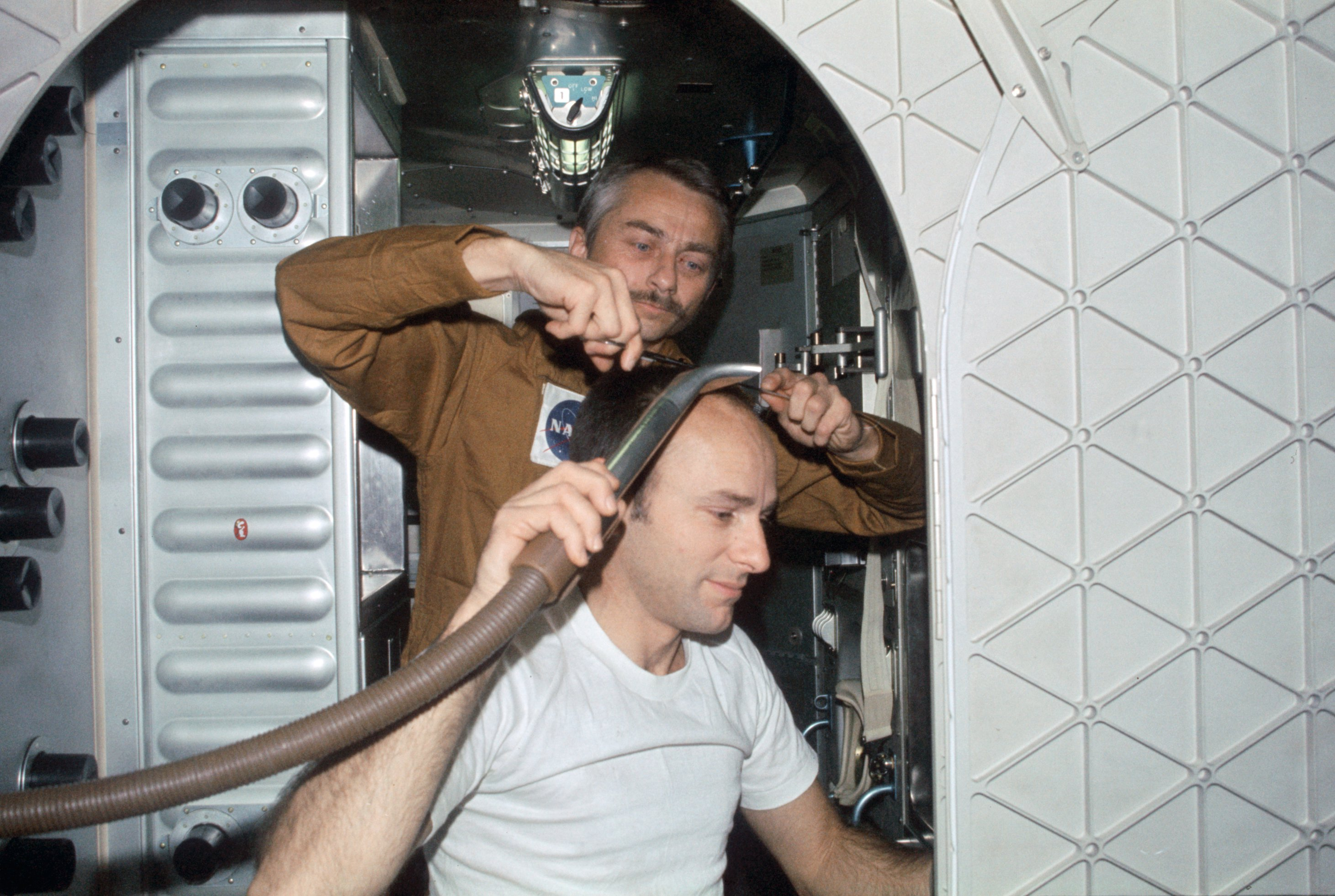
Garriott gives Bean a haircut.

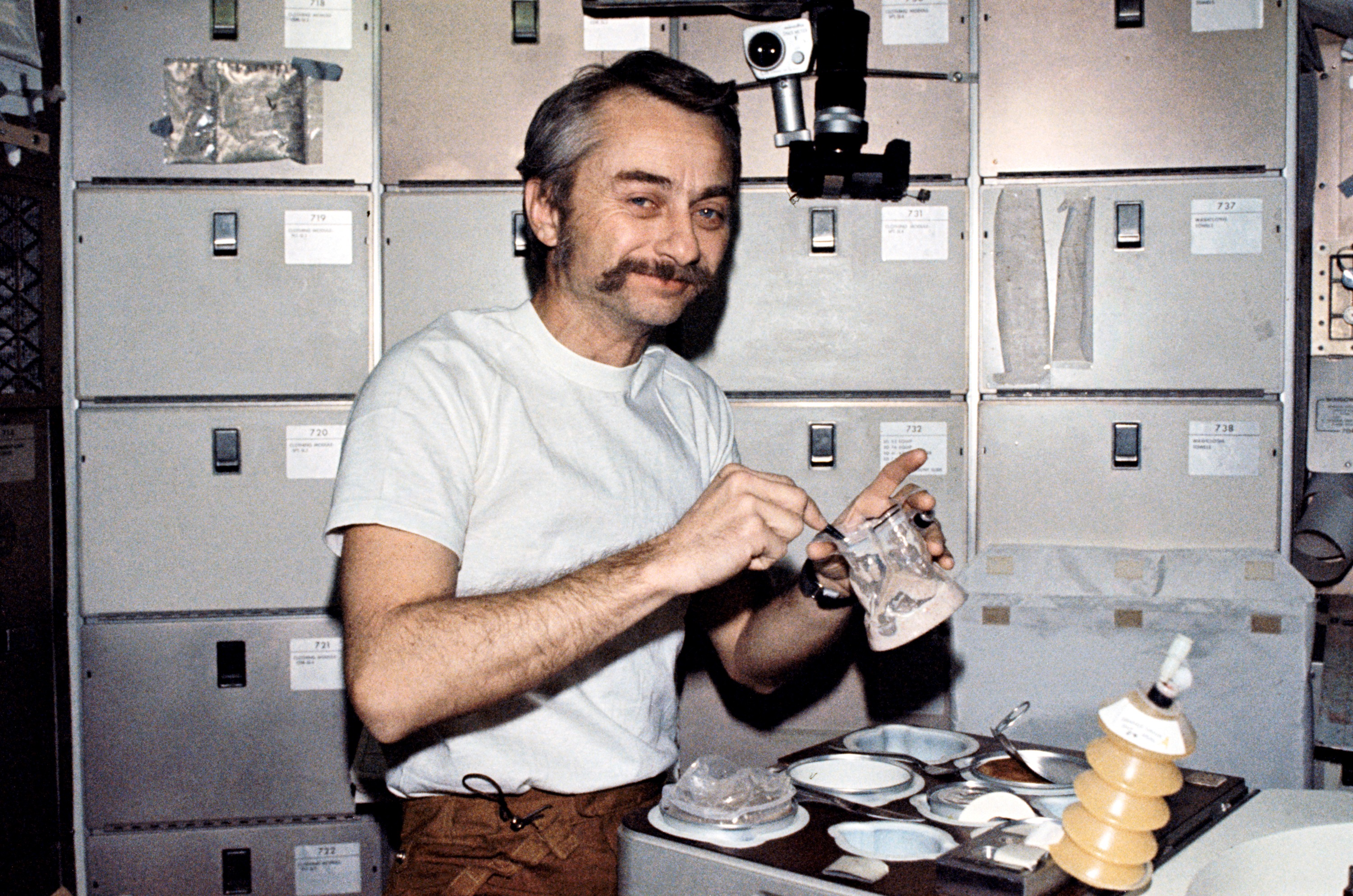
Garriott enjoying a meal in the station's wardroom

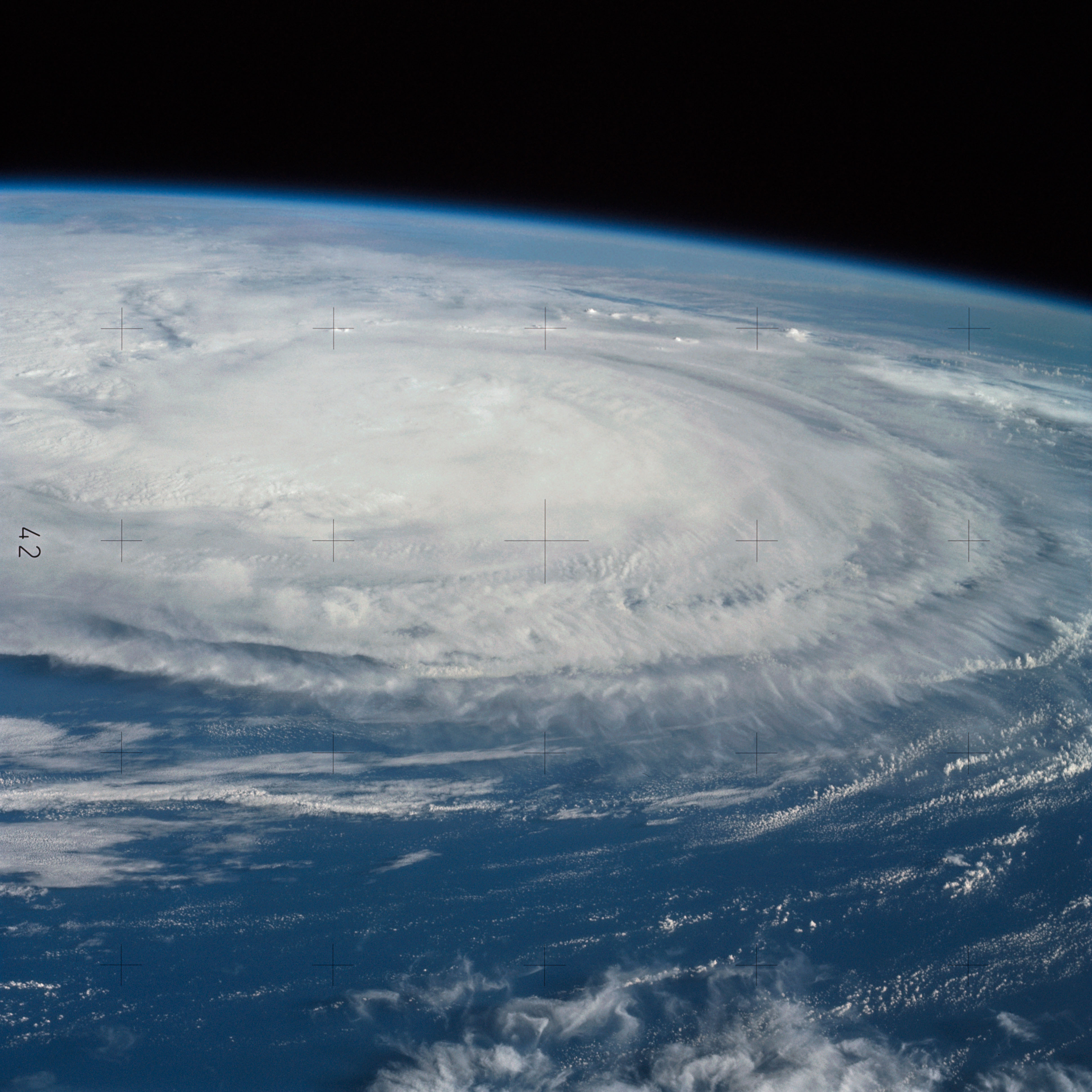
Hurricane Ellen of 1973, as seen from Skylab

== See also ==
- 1973 in spaceflight
- Splashdown (spacecraft landing)
- Timeline of longest spaceflights
