= Skylab (disambiguation) =

Skylab was the first space station launched into orbit by the United States.

Skylab may also refer to:

- Skylab (band), a musical outfit formed in 1993
- Skylab (film), 2021 Indian Telugu-language film
- Skylab Gallery, gallery and performance space in Columbus, Ohio
- Skylab, a tower structure at Amundsen–Scott South Pole Station
- Rogério Skylab, Brazilian artist
  - Skylab (album), a 1999 album by Rogério Skylab
- Habal-habal, a type of motorcycle taxi common in the Philippines colloquially referred to as "skylab" due to their resemblance to the space station

== See also ==
- Skylab 1, the uncrewed launch of Skylab
- Skylab 2, the first crewed mission to Skylab
- Skylab II, a proposed lunar space station named in homage to Skylab
- Skylab 3, the second crewed mission to Skylab
- Skylab 4, the third and last crewed mission to Skylab
- Skylab B, a backup Skylab station, proposed for a second launch but never used
- Skylab Rescue, a contingency mission for a stranded Skylab crew, never needed
- Skylab IX, a live album by Rogério Skylab
- Skylab One (disambiguation)
- Skylab Two (disambiguation)
- Skylab Three (disambiguation)
- Skylab Four (disambiguation)
