= Skylab Four =

Skylab Four may refer to:

- Skylab 4 (SL-4), the fourth Skylab mission
- Skylab 5 (SLM-4), the fourth crewed Skylab mission
- Skylab IV, a 2003 album by Rogério Skylab

== See also ==
- Skylab (disambiguation)
- Skylab One (disambiguation)
- Skylab Two (disambiguation)
- Skylab Three (disambiguation)
