= Skylab Three =

Skylab Three may refer to:

- Skylab 3 (SL-3), third Skylab mission
- Skylab 4 (SLM-3), third crewed Skylab mission
- Skylab C, the Earth-bound ground-based full-sized trainer for Skylab
- Skylab III, a 2002 album by Rogério Skylab

== See also ==
- Skylab One (disambiguation)
- Skylab Two (disambiguation)
- Skylab Four (disambiguation)
- Skylab (disambiguation)
