= Maia Cruz Palileo =

American interdisciplinary artist (b. 1979)

- Born: 1979 (age 46–47); Chicago, IL
- Education: Mount Holyoke College, Brooklyn College, City University of New York, Skowhegan School of Painting and Sculpture
- Website: www.maiacruzpalileo.com

Maia Cruz Palileo is an interdisciplinary artist based in Brooklyn, New York. Their work consists of paintings, drawings and sculptures, and explores their Filipino, American heritage through the examination of memory, family photographs, and oral histories.

== Background and education ==
Maia Cruz Palileo was born in 1979 in Chicago Illinois, to parents who had emigrated from the Philippines. They received a BA in Studio Art at Mount Holyoke College (2001), and an MFA from Brooklyn College, City University of New York (2008). They attended the Skowhegan School of Painting and Sculpture in 2015. The death of Palileo's mother, in 1999, affected them profoundly. They described the event as "completely severing my connection to home, both geographically and psychologically. My naïve sense of wholeness and security was changed forever and I’ve been making work about it ever since.” They have also taught at the Parsons School of Design, The New School and LaGuardia Community College, City University of New York.

== Work ==
Palileo is best known for their paintings. Their work has been described as a cultural and historical pastiche that has a "tropical gothic" aesthetic, a term associated with the Filipino writer Nick Joaquin. Cora Fisher of ArtForum writes that Palileo's paintings are "redolent with history but not beholden to it. The artist’s figures, emancipated from their source material, now look back at us as part of their decolonized imagination." They use photographs of places their family has lived as inspiration for many of their paintings. In their exhibition "Curves of a Meandering Creek" at PioneerWorks, Palileo examined the Philippines' legacy of colonialism. The imagery for this body of work was rooted in 19th Century colonialist culture, which they researched at the Newberry Library in Chicago. The ethnographic photographs of Dean Conant Worcester, the watercolors of Damian Domingo, and a text by Isabelo de los Reyes, were all sources that they used in the work, ultimately transforming the narratives.

== Exhibitions ==
Palileo has had solo exhibitions at Monique Meloche Gallery, Taymour Grahne Gallery, Pioneer Works, Cuchifritos Gallery + Project Space, and Soapbox Gallery. They have participated in group exhibitions at Yutaka Kikutake Gallery, the Rubin Museum of Art, Skylab Gallery, Alfred University, the Leslie-Lohman Museum of Gay and Lesbian Art, and the CUE Art Foundation.

They have also been a part of group exhibitions such as Spirit in the Land exhibited at the Pérez Art Museum Miami, FL (2024), and Nasher Museum of Art at Duke University (2023), Taymour Grahne Projects in London, UK (2021), PHI Foundation for Contemporary Art in Montréal, Quebec (2020), the Jessica Silverman Gallery in San Francisco, CA (2019), Yutaka Kikutake Gallery in Tokyo, Japan (2018), and many others.

== Recognition ==
Palileo has received grants from the Rema Hort Mann Foundation, the Joan Mitchell Foundation, the New York Foundation for the Arts, the Jerome Foundation, the Astraea Visual Arts Fund, the Nancy Graves Foundation, the Art Matters Foundation. They have participated in residencies at the Skowhegan School of Painting and Sculpture, the Lower East Side Print Shop, the Millay Colony, and the Joan Mitchell Center.
