= María Berrío =

Colombian artist

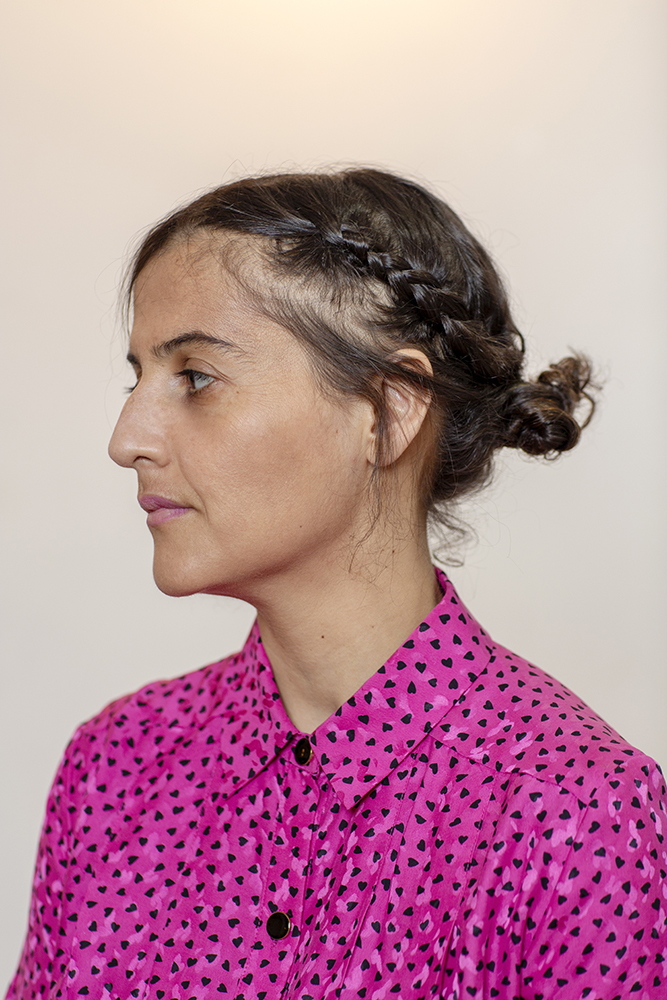
- María Berrío, 2019
- Born: 1982 (age 43–44); Bogotá, Colombia
- Education: Parsons; School of Visual Arts

María Berrío (born 1982) is a Colombian-born visual artist working in Brooklyn, New York. The LA Times wrote that Berrío's large-scale collage works, "meticulously crafted from layers of Japanese paper, reflect on cross-cultural connections and global migration seen through the prism of her own history." She is known for her use of Japanese print paper, which she cuts and tears to create collages with details painted in with watercolour. Berrío, who spent her childhood in Colombia and moved to the US in her teens, draws from Colombian folklore and South American literature. Salomé Gómez-Upegui describes Berrío's work and inspirations by stating, "Women, narratives of displacement, and ecology play a central role in Berrío’s striking compositions, which are very much inspired by Latin American magical realism." In her interview with The Georgia Review in 2019, the artist discusses the tradition of aluna of the Kogi people in her work Aluna (2017). Berrío's collages are characterized by representations of mainly women, who often stare back at the viewer.

== Early life and education ==
Berrío grew up in Bogotá, Colombia, with her two brothers. During her childhood, it was a dangerous time in Colombia with the drug war and Pablo Escobar. Her family would get out of the city and visit their farm on weekends, where it was less dangerous and they had more freedom.

At 18, Berrío moved to New York where she received her BFA from Parsons School of Design in 2004 and, in 2007, received her MFA from the School of Visual Arts. During this time, she mainly trained in charcoal drawing and painting until she discovered Japanese paper and started incorporating it in her collages during her MFA.

== Career ==
Her work is included in the collections of the Pérez Art Museum Miami, the Yuz Museum Shanghai, the Pennsylvania Academy of Fine Arts, the National Gallery of Art, and the Whitney Museum of American Art. In 2021, Berrío was awarded the Joan Mitchell Fellowship from the Joan Mitchell Foundation. Berrío's work was included in the 2022 exhibition Women Painting Women at the Modern Art Museum of Fort Worth.

In 2023, Berrío presented a major solo show María Berrío: The Children's Crusade at the Institute of Contemporary Art/Boston. The set of large-scale paintings in the show were part of the series of same time that takes inspiration on contemporary stories of border crossing juxtaposed with the Children’s Crusade of 1212 telling, in which thousands of children pilgrimage through Italy and France to convert Muslims to Christianity.

Berrío's work is included in the exhibition and accompanying publication Spirit in the Land, organized by and displayed in the Nasher Museum of Art at Duke University in 2023, and traveling to the Pérez Art Museum Miami in 2024. The exhibition revolves around the need for coexistence between natural worlds and human life, particularly thinking through the work of artists from North America and the Caribbean.

== Themes ==
Berrío’s work often revolves around a variety of themes, including nostalgia, fantasy, legends, nature, childhood, immigration, identity, femininity, and current issues. Much of this comes from her personal experience as a woman and an immigrant, as well as experiences from her childhood. Her collages are commonly centered around femininity and women. The work often speaks for itself, showing off a sense of refuge and safety for these womanly figures. Berrío bases a lot of the storytelling of her collages as a part of South American folklore, in the way that meshes nature and humans to coexist in a kind of harmony. In addition to this type of harmony, Berrío uses her art to shed light on the harsh realities of politics. For example, according to art critic Siddhartha Mitter, she has created works that consider migration across the Mexico-United States border in which "Women cluster with animals and birds in scenes that convey the bravery and peril of the migration experience."

== Solo Exhibitions ==
2025 María Berrío: Soliloquy of the Wounded Earth, Hauser & Wirth, New York

2024 María Berrío: The End of Ritual, Victoria Miro, London, UK

2024 María Berrío: Spotlight, The FLAG Art Foundation, New York, NY, USA

2023 María Berrío: The Children’s Crusade, Institute of Contemporary Art (ICA), Boston, USA

2022 María Berrío: The Land of the Sun, Victoria Miro, Venice, Italy

2021 María Berrío: Esperando mientras la noche florece (Waiting for the Night to Bloom), Norton Museum of Art, West Palm Beach, Florida, USA

2020 María Berrío: Flowered Songs and Broken Currents, Victoria Miro, London, UK

2020 María Berrío: A Day’s Cadence, an extended reality (XR) exhibition on Vortic Collect, Victoria Miro, London, UK

2019 A Cloud’s Roots, Kohn Gallery, Los Angeles, CA, USA

2017 In a Time of Drought, Praxis International Gallery, New York, NY, USA

2015 The Harmony of the Spheres, Praxis International Gallery, New York, NY, USA

2013 Dream Gardens, Praxis International Gallery, New York, NY, USA

2012 Of Dreams and Hurricanes, Praxis International Gallery, New York, NY, USA

== Group Exhibitions ==
Berrío has participated in over 50 group exhibitions beginning in 2007, in a variety of galleries, museums, and university spaces. Her work has been shown all over the United States but has also appeared internationally in London, Venice, the Netherlands, and Israel.

== Awards ==
- 2012 Colectivo Puebla, Puebla, Mexico
- 2013 Chachama New York City, New York, NY, USA
- 2014 Elizabeth Foundation for the Arts, New York, NY, USA
- 2016 Sharpe Walentas Studio Program, Brooklyn, NY, USA
- 2017 Smack Mellon Studio Program, Brooklyn, NY, USA
- 2017 United States Artist Award Nominee, USA
- 2018 NYFA Fellowship in Painting, Brooklyn, NY, USA
- 2019 Navigator Art Paper Prize Finalist, Lisbon, Portugal
- 2020 The Herb Alpert Award in the Arts Nominee, Santa Monica, CA, USA
- 2020 Joan Mitchell Foundation Fellowship, New York, NY, USA
