= Flight spare =

Copy of a spacecraft or spacecraft part

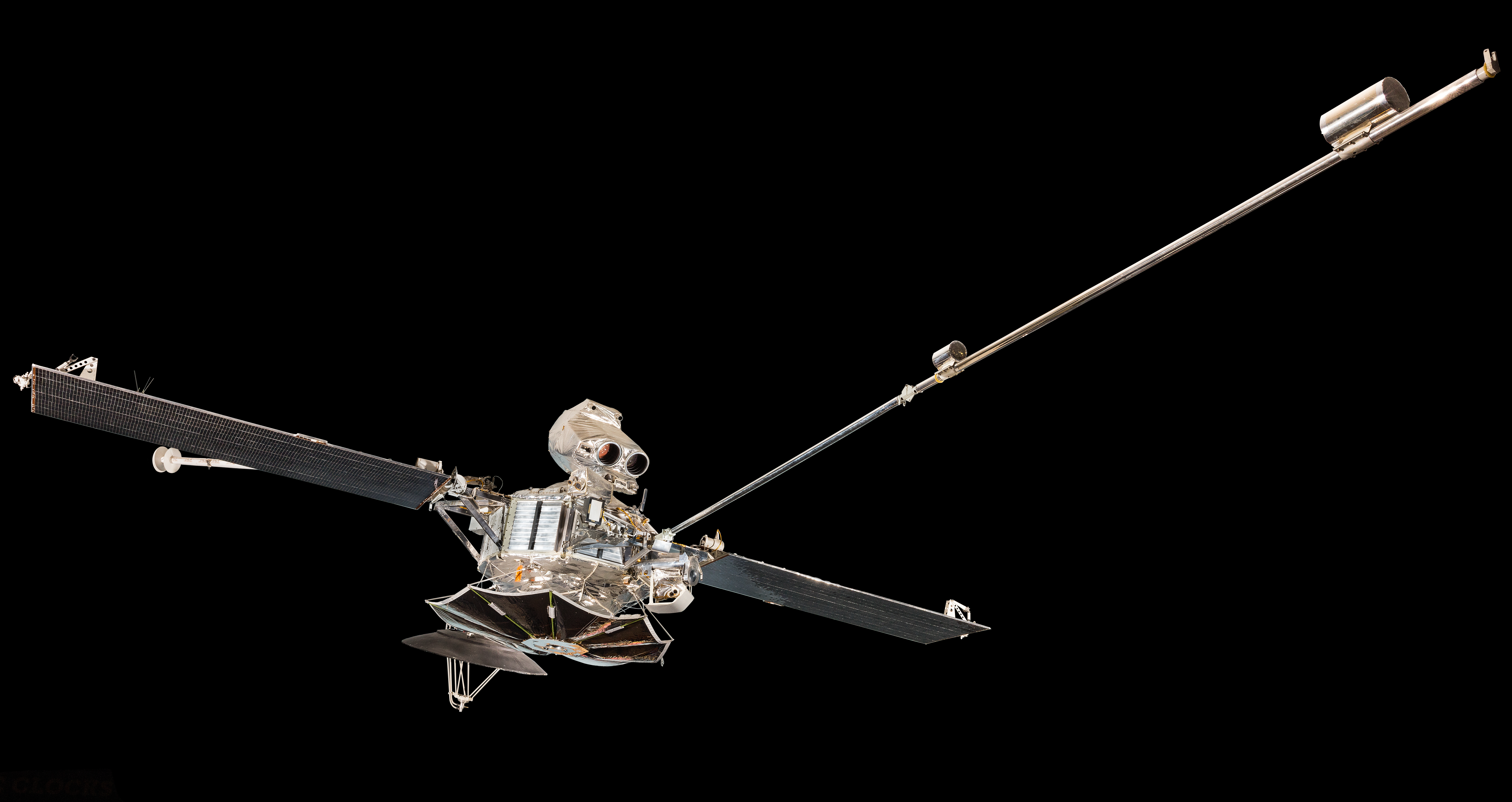
A complete copy of Mariner 10 was constructed but never used. NASA gave it to the Smithsonian Institution in 1982, which currently displays it in the Time and Navigation exhibition at the National Air and Space Museum.

A flight spare is a copy of a spacecraft or spacecraft part which is held in reserve in case it is needed for the mission. Flight spares are built to the same specifications as the original equipment (the "flight model"), and can be substituted in the case of damage or other problems with the flight model, reducing launch delays. The extra cost of building a flight spare can be justified by the enormous cost of delaying a launch by even a short amount of time.

== Primary function ==
Flight spares are constructed as contingencies. As such, spare parts may be swapped onto a craft before launch, or completed spare spacecraft may be launched if the flight model is lost.

NASA has two basic types of spares, development spares and operational spares. NASA makes a determination about which parts need spares based on whether parts are custom built, and the lead-time for procurement. It also makes determinations about the quantities of spares, based on whether the part is critical to system operation, failure rate, and the expected life of the part.

The flight spare can also be useful during a space mission if a change to the original plan is required, since the effect of changes can be safely tested on the ground.

== Reusage ==
Flight spares that go unused in their initial missions are still considered valuable. A 2017 NASA report on flight spare inventory control mentions hundreds of millions of dollars' worth of inventory, not all of it catalogued properly.

=== New missions for old hardware ===
Individual spare components manufactured for one mission may eventually fly on another. As a cost-saving measure, the Magellan spacecraft was made largely out of such parts:

Reuse type legend
Flight spare
Design reuse

Component	Origin
Attitude control computer	Galileo
Bus	Voyager program
Command and data subsystem	Galileo
High- and low-gain antenna	Voyager program
Medium-gain antenna	Mariner 9
Power distribution unit	Galileo
Propellant tank	Space Shuttle auxiliary power unit
Pyrotechnic control	Galileo
Radio-frequency traveling-wave tube assemblies	Ulysses
Solid rocket motor	Space Shuttle Payload Assist Module
Star scanner	Inertial Upper Stage
Thrusters	Voyager program

=== Flight spares on display ===
Since few space probes return to Earth intact, flight spares are useful for posterity, and may go to museums. The Mariner 10 flight spare is such an example, and Skylab B is another. Both of these are located at the National Air and Space Museum in Washington, DC.

== See also ==
- Orbit Replaceable Units
- Spare part
