= Dario Robleto =

American artist

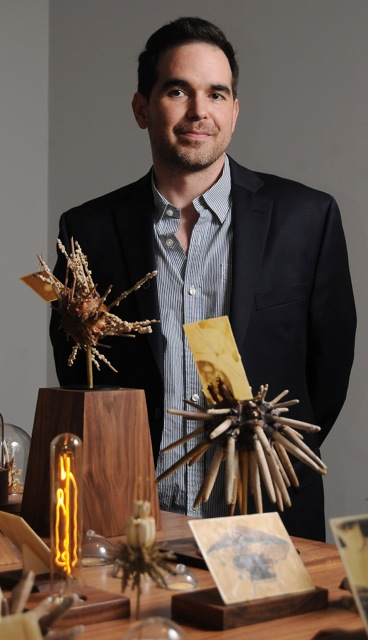
- Born: 1972 (age 53–54); San Antonio, Texas, U.S.
- Education: B.F.A. '97 The University of Texas at San Antonio
- Occupation: artist

Dario Robleto (born 1972) is an American transdisciplinary artist, researcher, writer, and teacher. His research-driven practice results in intricately handcrafted objects that reflect his exploration of music, popular culture, science, war, and American history.

== Early life and education ==
Robleto was born in San Antonio, Texas, in 1972 and he received his BFA from the University of Texas at San Antonio in 1997.

== Work and career ==
Robleto uses unexpected materials such as melted vinyl records, dinosaur bones, meteorites, glass produced by atomic explosions, and lost heartbeat recordings from the 19th century. He transforms them into delicately layered objects that are sincere and personal meditations on love, death, eroding memory, and healing.

Robleto has been participating in activities outside the art world. In 2015, he was appointed as Artist in Residence in Neuroaesthetics at the University of Houston's Cullen College of Engineering, and he was invited to co-organize the 2016 International Conference on Mobile Brain-Body Imaging and the Neuroscience of Art, Innovation, and Creativity, he is co-organizing year 2 of the conference in 2017.

In 2015, Robleto and Contreras-Vidal co-authored a scholarly paper titled "Your Brain on Art: Emergent Cortical Dynamics During Aesthetic Experiences”. The study considered “the brain response to conceptual art [as] studied with mobile electroencephalography (EEG) to examine the neural basis of aesthetic experiences.” In February 2016, Robleto was co-editor of "Mobile Brain/Body Imaging and the Neuroscience of Art, Innovation and Creativity" in a special issue of the science journal Frontiers in Human Neuroscience.

From 2016 to 2017, Robleto was an artist-in-residence at the SETI Institute in Mountain View, California. In 2015, he joined Breakthrough Initiatives as the artistic consultant for Breakthrough Message, an effort encouraging technical and intellectual debate on how to design a message communicating human culture and Earth should intelligent life beyond Earth be discovered.

Robleto has been a visiting artist and lecturer at many universities and institutions including Bard College, Annandale-on-Hudson, New York; Massachusetts Institute of Technology, Cambridge, Massachusetts; and the Hubble Space Telescope Science Institute, Baltimore, Maryland. In 2013, he served as the California College of the Arts Viola Frey Distinguished Visiting Professor, in Oakland, California. From 2018 to 2023, Robleto served as the first Artist-at-Large at Northwestern University's McCormick School of Engineering and Mary and Leigh Block Museum of Art, Evanston, Illinois.

== Awards, recognitions, and other media ==
Awards have included the 2004 International Association of Art Critics Award for best exhibition in a commercial gallery at the national level. The exhibition was Roses in the Hospital / Men Are The New Women at Inman Gallery in 2003. In 2007 he was a recipient of the Joan Mitchell Foundation Grant and in 2009 he was a recipient of the USA Rasmuson Fellowship. Robleto has been a research fellow and resident at institutions such as the Menil Collection (2014); Rice University (2013–14); and the Smithsonian Museum of American History (2011). He served as the 2016 Texas State Artist Laureate, he currently sits on the advisory board at the Nasher Museum of Art at Duke University and is on the Boston Institute of Contemporary Art Teen Conference Advisory Committee.

Robleto has participated in many residencies including the Headlands Center for the Arts, Sausalito, California, in 2014; and Artpace, San Antonio, Texas, in 2000. In 2017 he was chosen as an Artist in Residence at the Robert Rauschenberg Foundation.

His work has been profiled in numerous publications and media including Radiolab, Krista Tippet's On Being, the New York Times, and the New York Times Science Section.

Robleto's diptych The First Time, The Heart (First Pulse, Flatline), 2017 was awarded a “Prix de Print” award. The Prix de Print is a bimonthly competition, in which a single work is selected by an outside juror to be the subject of a brief essay. Robleto's diptych recalls the method of the first sphygmograph, a technology that made its first marks in soot using a human hair as a stylus, and the data it produced to suggest the life cycle, from the first pulse to the final flat line. Prix de Print

=== Selected solo exhibitions ===
2023

- The Heart’s Knowledge: Science and Empathy in the Art of Dario Robleto, The Block Museum of Art, Northwestern University, Evanston, Illinois

2019

- Unknown and Solitary Seas (Dreams and Emotions of the 19th Century), Radcliffe Institute for Advanced Study, Harvard University, Cambridge, Massachusetts

2018

- Ancient Beacons Long for Notice, McNay Art Museum, San Antonio, Texas

2014

- Setlists For a Setting Sun, The Baltimore Museum of Art, Baltimore, Maryland
- The Boundary of Life is Quietly Crossed, The Menil Collection, Houston, Texas

2012

- The Prelives of the Blues, New Orleans Museum of Art, New Orleans, Louisiana

2011

- Survival Does Not Lie in the Heavens, Des Moines Art Center, Des Moines, Iowa
- An Instinct Toward Life, Denver Museum of Contemporary Art, Denver, Colorado

2008

- Alloy of Love, The Francis Young Tang Teaching Museum and Art Gallery at Skidmore College, Saratoga Springs, New York; traveled to the Frye Art Museum, Seattle, Washington

2006

- Chrysanthemum Anthems, Weatherspoon Art Museum, University of North Carolina, Greensboro, North Carolina; traveled to Aldrich Contemporary Art Museum, Ridgefield, Connecticut; Hunter Museum of American Art, Chattanooga, Tennessee

2003

- Say Goodbye to Substance, Whitney Museum of American Art at Altria, New York, New York

=== Selected group exhibitions ===
2023-2024

- Spirit in the Land, Nasher Museum of Art at Duke University, North Carolina (2023), and Pérez Art Museum Miami, Florida (2024)

2019

- In Plain Sight, Mills College Art Museum, Oakland, California
- The Sorcerer's Burden: Contemporary Art And The Anthropological Turn, The Contemporary Austin, Austin, Texas
- Jewels In The Concrete, Ruby City, San Antonio, Texas
- Cosmic Rhythm Vibrations, Nasher Museum of Art, Duke University, Durham, North Carolina
- Ghostly Traces: Memory and Mortality in Contemporary Photography, Vicki Myhren Gallery at University of Denver, Denver, Colorado
- The Sheltering Sky, Palo Alto Art Center, Palo Alto, California
- Fear and Wonder: Sublime Landscapes on Paper, Museum of Fine Arts, Houston, Texas

2018

- Under Construction: Collage from The Mint Museum, Charlotte, North Carolina
- People Get Ready: Building a Contemporary Collection, Nasher Museum of Art at Duke University, Durham, North Carolina
- Texas, Philip Martin Gallery, Los Angeles, California
- Copy, Translate, Repeat: Contemporary Art from the Coleccion Patricia Phelps de Cisneros, Hunter College, 205 Hudson Gallery, New York, New York

2017

- Future Shock, SITE Santa Fe, Santa Fe, New Mexico
- Southern Accent: Seeking the American South in Contemporary Art, Speed Art Museum, Louisville, Kentucky
- If You Remember, I'll Remember, Mary and Leigh Block Museum of Art, North Western University, Evanston, Illinois
- Prospect 4: The Lotus In Spite of the Swamp, New Orleans, Louisiana

2016

- The Future We Remember, Southeastern Center for Contemporary Art, Winston-Salem, North Carolina
- Explode Every Day: An Inquiry into the Phenomena of Wonder, MASS MoCA, North Adams, Massachusetts
- Southern Accent: Seeking the American South in Contemporary Art, Nasher Museum of Art at Duke University, Durham, North Carolina

2015

- 20 Years/20 Shows, SITE Santa Fe, Santa Fe, New Mexico

2014

- DIRGE: Reflections on (Life and) Death, Museum of Contemporary Art, Cleveland, Ohio

2013

- MORE LOVE ART, POLITICS, and SHARING Since the 1990s, Ackland Museum of Art, The University of North Carolina at Chapel Hill, Chapel Hill, North Carolina; traveled to Cheekwood Botanical Garden and Museum of Art, Nashville, Tennessee

2012

- More Real? Art in the Age of Truthiness, Minneapolis Institute of Art, Minneapolis, Minnesota; traveled to SITE Santa Fe, Santa Fe, New Mexico

2011

- The Spectacular of Vernacular, Walker Art Center, Minneapolis, Minnesota; traveled to Contemporary Arts Museum, Houston, Texas; Montclair Art Museum, Montclair, New Jersey; Ackland Art Museum, The University of North Carolina at Chapel Hill, Chapel Hill, North Carolina

2010

- The Record: Contemporary ART and VINYL, Nasher Museum of Art at Duke University, Durham, North Carolina; traveled to Institute of Contemporary Art, Boston, Massachusetts; Miami Art Museum, Miami, Florida; Henry Art Gallery, University of Washington, Seattle, Washington

2008

- The Old, Weird America, Contemporary Arts Museum, Houston, Texas; traveled to DeCordova Museum and Sculpture Park, Lincoln, Massachusetts; Frye Art Museum, Seattle, Washington

2004

- 2004 Biennial Exhibition, Whitney Museum of American Art, New York, New York

=== Publications: author and co-author ===
2019

- Contreras-Vidal J.L., Robleto, D., Jesus G. Cruz-Garza J.G., José M. Azorín J.M., Nam, C.S., "Mobile Brain-Body Imaging and the Neuroscience of Art, Innovation and Creativity (Springer Series on Bio- and Neurosystems)" Springer, Cham
- Cruz-Garza J.G., Chatufale G., Robleto D., Contreras-Vidal J.L. "Your Brain on Art: A New Paradigm to Study Artistic Creativity Based on the ‘Exquisite Corpse’ Using Mobile Brain-Body Imaging." Brain Art. Nijholt A. (eds) Springer, Cham
- The Heart's Knowledge Will Never Decay, Designing For Empathy: Perspectives On the Museum Experience, edited by. Elif M. Gokcigdem, 18-29. Rowman & Littlefield, 2019
- Contreras-Vidal, Jose L., Jeannie Kever, Dario Robleto, and James Rosengren. "At the Crossroads of Art and Science: Neuroaesthetics Begins to Come into Its Own," Leonardo, Volume 52, Issue 1, February 1

2018

- Berry, Ian, Rebecca McNamara. Accelerate No.2. Saratoga Springs, New York. The Frances Young Tang Teaching Museum and Art Gallery
- Montgomery, Harper. Copy, Translate, Repeat: Contemporary Art from the Colección Patricia Phelps de Cisneros. New York, New York. Hunter College Art Galleries

2017

- Contreras-Vidal, Jose Luis, Robleto, Dario. “Looking Under the Sacred Rock: How Collaborations between Scientists and Artists Can More Deeply Probe the Mysteries of Creativity,” SCIART Magazine, August
- Contreras-Vidal, Kever, Robleto, and Rosengren, James. “At the Crossroads of Art and Science: Neuroaesthetics Begins to Come into Its Own,” Leonardo, June 20
- Cruz-Garza, Brantley, Nakagome, Kontson, Megjhani, Robleto, Contreras-Vidal. “Deployment of Mobile EEG Technology in an Art Museum Setting: Evaluation of Signal Quality and Usability,” Frontiers In Human Neuroscience, November 10

2016

- "Dreams, as Faithful as Flames.” Paper presented at International Conference on Mobile Brain-Body Imaging and The Neuroscience of Art, Innovation and Creativity, Cancun, Mexico, July
- “Honky-Tonks and Hospices,” Southern Accent: Seeking the American South in Contemporary Art (Nasher Museum of Art at Duke University, Durham, North Carolina, exhibition catalogue)
- Gramann, Contreras-Vidal, Makeig, Robleto, Brandt, Frazier and Schmuckli. “Mobile Brain/Body Imaging and the Neuroscience of Art, Innovation and Creativity,” Frontiers in Human Neuroscience, February

2015

- Kontson, Megjhani, Brantley, Cruz-Garza, Nakagome, Robleto, White, Civillico and Contreras-Vidal. “Your Brain on Art: Emergent Cortical Dynamics During Aesthetic Experiences,” Frontiers in Human Neuroscience, November 18

2014

- White and Robleto. The Boundary of Life Is Quietly Crossed. (The Menil Collection, Houston Texas, exhibition brochure).

2013

- “If You Remember, I'll Remember,” Disembodied Portraits: Portrait Miniatures and Their Contemporary Relatives (The Cleveland Museum of Art, Cleveland, Ohio, exhibition catalogue)

2012

- “Lunge For Love As If It Were Air,” More Love: ART, POLITICS and SHARING Since the 1990s (Ackland Art Museum, Chapel Hill, North Carolina, exhibition catalogue)

2010

- “Every Record, Everywhere, Is Playing Our Song Right Now,” The Record: Contemporary Art and Vinyl (Nasher Museum of Art at Duke University, Durham, North Carolina, exhibition catalogue)

2001

- “When You Cry, I Only Love You More,” ArtLies, Fall. pp 3–7

1999

- “I Love Everything Rock ‘n’ Roll (Except the Music),” The National Association of Artists’ Organizations Field Guide 1999–2000

== Selected public collections ==
- Albright–Knox Art Gallery, Buffalo, New York
- Altoids Curiously Strong Collection/New Museum of Contemporary Art, New York, New York
- Austin Museum of Art, Austin, Texas
- Colección Patricia Phelps de Cisneros, New York, New York
- Des Moines Art Center, Des Moines, Iowa
- Hirshhorn Museum and Sculpture Garden, Washington, D.C.
- Jack S. Blanton Museum of Art, University of Texas, Austin, Texas
- Le Centre d'Art Contemporain, Montpellier, France
- Linda Pace Foundation, San Antonio, Texas
- Los Angeles County Museum of Art, Los Angeles, California
- Mary and Leigh Block Museum of Art, Northwestern University, Evanston, Illinois
- Museum of Contemporary Art, San Diego, California
- Nasher Museum of Art at Duke University, Durham, North Carolina
- New Orleans Museum of Art, New Orleans, Louisiana
- The Baltimore Museum of Art, Baltimore, Maryland
- The Frances Young Tang Teaching Museum, Saratoga Springs, New York
- The Menil Collection, Houston, Texas
- The Museum of Fine Arts, Houston, Texas
- Ulrich Museum of Art, Wichita State University, Wichita, Kansas
- Whitney Museum of American Art, New York, New York
