= Nasher Museum of Art =

Museum in Durham, North Carolina

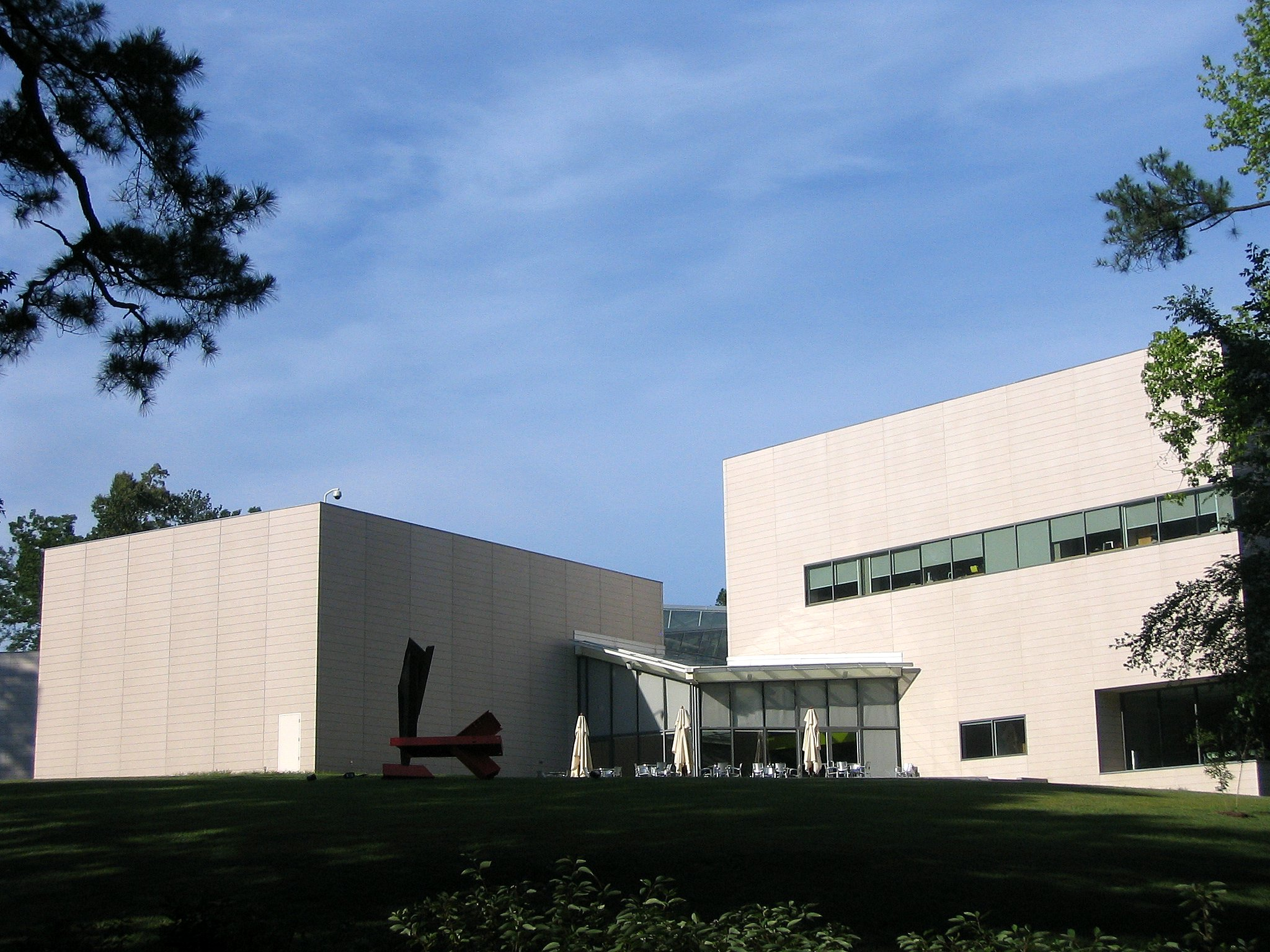

General information
- Type: Art museum
- Architectural style: Modern
- Location: 2001 Campus Drive; Central Campus, Duke University
- Coordinates: 35°59′56.63″N 78°55′44.59″W
- Named for: Raymond Nasher
- Completed: 2005
- Opened: 1969
- Cost: $24 million

Design and construction
- Architect: Rafael Viñoly

Website
- nasher.duke.edu

The Nasher Museum of Art (previously the Duke University Museum of Art) is the art museum of Duke University, and is located on Duke's campus in Durham, North Carolina, United States.

== History ==
In 1936, art collector William Hayes Ackland wrote letters to three universities, attempting to find a place to bequest his collection to upon his death. Duke University President William Preston Few was receptive to this idea, and had plans drawn up for an art museum at Duke. After the death of both Few and Ackland, Duke refused to accept the gift, for reasons still not disclosed. Ackland's estate had to posthumously find a new location to build a museum, eventually creating the Ackland Art Museum.

In 1969, the university established the Duke University Museum of Art on Duke's East Campus with medieval art from the Ernest Brummer Collection.

In the later twentieth century, there was a push to move the location of the museum to a more central location. Professors of botany fought the plan because the new location would disturb the "botanical study area," a field of plants.

In the early twenty-first century, in part from a gift by alumnus Raymond Nasher, the museum became known as the Nasher Museum of Art and opened a new $24 million museum designed by architect Rafael Viñoly. Since its reopening, annual attendance is about 100,000 visitors.

Mary D.B.T., great-granddaughter of Benjamin Newton Duke, brother of James Buchanan Duke, and James H. Semans were major contributors to the university art museum. From 1987 to 2003, Michael Mezzatesta was the director and oversaw the construction of the museum's new site. Kim Rorschach was the museum's founding director from 2004-2012. Sarah Schroth, former Nancy Hanks Senior Curator, was the director of the museum from 2013-2020. Trevor Schoonmaker, the museum's first curator of contemporary art, has been the museum director from May 2020-present.

== Collection ==
The collection contains more than 13,000 works of art, including works by Nina Chanel Abney, Ai Weiwei, John Akomfrah, Njideka Akunyili Crosby, Emma Amos (painter), Firelei Báez, Radcliffe Bailey, Maria Berrio, Sanford Biggers, Christian Boltanski, Mel Chin, William Cordova, Marlene Dumas, Darío Escobar, Genevieve Gaignard, Jeffrey Gibson, Barkley L. Hendricks, Rashid Johnson, Taiyo Kimura, Christian Marclay, Kerry James Marshall, Zanele Muholi, Wangechi Mutu, Odili Donald Odita, Maia Cruz Palileo, Ebony G. Patterson, Dan Perjovschi, Michelangelo Pistoletto, Robin Rhode, Dario Robleto, Amy Sherald, Xaviera Simmons, Lorna Simpson, Jaune Quick-to-See Smith, Eve Sussman, Henry Taylor (artist), Alma Thomas, Hank Willis Thomas, Mickalene Thomas, Bob Thompson, Kara Walker, Nari Ward, Carrie Mae Weems, Kehinde Wiley, Fred Wilson and Lynette Yiadom Boakye. The museum is dedicated to presenting contemporary art from around the world, with particular attention given to those who have been historically underrepresented.

The museum has a strong collection of Pre-Columbian art (3,300 objects), with particularly significant holdings of Mayan ceramics and Peruvian textiles.

== Selected exhibitions ==
The Record: Contemporary Art and Vinyl

September 2, 2010 – February 6, 2011

This was the first museum exhibition to explore the culture of vinyl records within the history of contemporary art. Bringing together forty-one artists from around the world who have worked with records as their subject or medium, The Record combined contemporary art with outsider art, audio with visual, fine art with popular culture, and established artists with those exhibiting in a U.S. museum for the first time. The 41 artists in the exhibition included Laurie Anderson, David Byrne, Janet Cardiff, William Cordova, Jeroen Diepenmaat, Jasper Johns, Jack Goldstein, Taiyo Kimura, Ralph Lemon, Christian Marclay, Mingering Mike, Dave Muller, Vik Muniz, 9th Wonder, DJ Rekha, Robin Rhode, Dario Robleto, Ed Ruscha, Malick Sidibe, Xaviera Simmons, Su-Mei Tse, and Carrie Mae Weems. The exhibition was curated by Trevor Schoonmaker.

Barkley L. Hendricks: Birth of the Cool

February 7, 2008 – July 13, 2008

This exhibit was the first career painting retrospective of American artist Barkley L. Hendricks. This exhibition of Hendricks' paintings includes work from 1964 to the present. The exhibition traveled to the Studio Museum in Harlem, the Santa Monica Museum (Los Angeles), the Pennsylvania Academy of Fine Arts in Philadelphia, and the Contemporary Arts Museum in Houston. A full-color exhibition catalogue with over 160 reproductions, edited by the Nasher Museum's curator of contemporary art Trevor Schoonmaker, was included.

El Greco to Velazquez: Art during the Reign of Philip III

August 21, 2008 – November 9, 2008

The Nasher Museum collaborated with the Museum of Fine Arts, Boston to present this exhibition – the first in the US to focus on Spanish art of the period between 1598 and 1621. The show examined a fascinating period bookended by the two giants of Spanish painting: the late works of El Greco and the early paintings of Velázquez.

The exhibition included some 120 paintings, sculptures and decorative art pieces, representing 20 artists. The masters were in context with lesser-known artists working during this time in Spain. Key loans from the Metropolitan Museum of Art, the Museo del Prado, the Kunsthistorisches Museum, Vienna, and the National Gallery of Art, among other institutions and private lenders, were secured.
