= Michael P. Mezzatesta =

American art historian and curator

- Education: Columbia University (BA); New York University (PhD)
- Occupations: Art historian, curator, museum director
- Title: Mary D.B.T. and James H. Semans Director of the Nasher Museum of Art at Duke University (1987–2003)
- Awards: Rome Prize (1979)

Michael P. Mezzatesta is an American art historian, curator, and museum director. He served as the Mary D.B.T. and James H. Semans Director of the Nasher Museum of Art at Duke University from 1987 to 2003.

== Biography ==
Mezzatesta received his B.A. from Columbia University in 1970 and Ph.D. from the New York University Institute of Fine Arts. He is a specialist of Renaissance art.

Mezzatesta started his museum career as a curator of European art at Kimbell Art Museum in Fort Worth, Texas. In 1987, he joined Walters Art Museum as director. He has organized exhibitions ranging from Gian Lorenzo Bernini to Henri Matisse at Kimbell and exhibitions from Mayan art to the works of Jackson Pollock and Louis Kahn. In 1993, he was named director of Walters Art Museum, but the offer was withdrawn just a few months later. In an interview with The New York Times, he claimed that his vision to make the museum more international and build up its profile in contemporary art conflicted with the priorities of the museum's board of directors.

Mezzatesta later returned to Duke, where he oversaw the construction of the new site of the Nasher Museum. He was named director emeritus in 2003 and continued to serve as an adjunct professor in Duke's department of art history.

Mezzatesta received a Rome Prize in 1979. He was a visiting fellow at the Institute for Advanced Study in 1986.
