= Skylab Two =

Skylab Two may refer to:

- Skylab 2 (SL-2), second mission in the Skylab space station program
- Skylab 3 (SLM-2), the second crewed mission to the Skylab space station
- Skylab II, NASA L2 space station concept
- Skylab B, backup Skylab space station
- Skylab II (album), an album by Rogério Skylab

== See also ==
- Skylab (disambiguation)
