= Skylab II =

Proposed space station, successor to the original Skylab

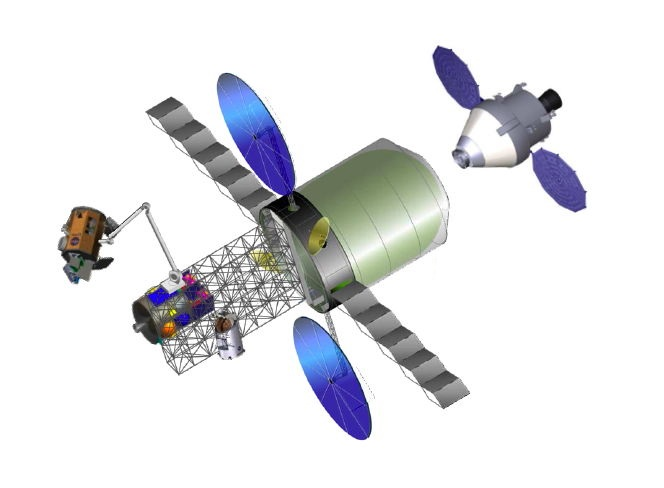
- Artist's conception of the Orion spacecraft docking with a module of the proposed Skylab II.

Station statistics
- Crew: 4
- Launch: after 2021
- Carrier rocket: Space Launch System
- Mission status: Proposed
- Mass: 37,300 kg (82,200 lb)
- Length: 11.15 m (36.6 ft)
- Diameter: 8.5 m (28 ft)
- Pressurised volume: 495 m^{3} (17,500 ft^{3})
- Orbital inclination: 5.145°
- Orbital period: 27.321661 days
- Days occupied: 60–180 days (planned)
- Configuration
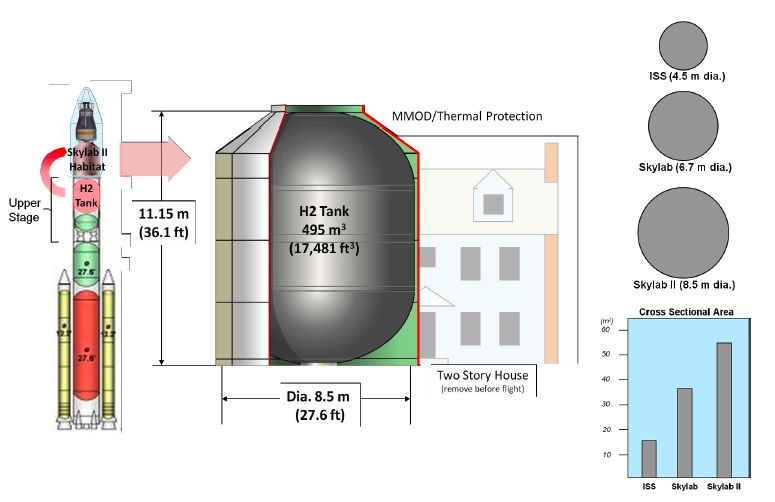
- Skylab II Habitat made from the SLS upper-stage hydrogen tank.

Skylab II was a space station concept proposed in 2013 by the Advanced Concepts Office of NASA Marshall Space Flight Center, to be located at the Earth-Moon L_{2} Lagrangian point. Proposed by NASA contractor Brand Griffin, Skylab II would have been constructed as a "wet workshop" using a spent upper-stage hydrogen fuel tank from the Space Launch System (SLS), much as the Skylab was originally planned to be built "wet" from the spent bipropellant tanks of the Saturn S-IVB upper stage. If constructed, Skylab II would have been the first crewed outpost located beyond the orbit of the Moon.

== Space station design ==
Skylab II would have orbited the Earth-Moon L_{2} point, which revolves around the Earth at an approximate mean distance of 443,000 kilometers (239,000 nmi) from the surface, and stays approximately 62,800 kilometers (33,900 nmi) beyond the far surface of the Moon. Given its location far away from the nearest food, water, and air, the first iteration of the space station would have had to have been able to support a four-person crew for 60 days on one shipment of supplies, to be eventually improved to 180 days. As Skylab II would be built from an SLS hydrogen fuel tank, the costs of assembly were estimated at a relatively low $2 billion, a tremendous savings over a previously projected cost of $4.175 billion for a similar space station.

The space station would have large modules with diameters of 8.5 m (28 ft) — much larger than the 4.5 m (15 ft) diameter of International Space Station modules or the 6.7 m (22 ft) diameter of the original Skylab. This large diameter would lead to a module volume of about 495 cubic meters (17,500 ft^{3}), allowing for a large amount of space for both storage and habitation. This large interior volume, in turn, would make Skylab II suitable for its deep-space location, where resupply missions would be rare and astronauts would have to store the food they received from each mission for months at a time. The supplies themselves could be carried in a variety of vehicles, such as the existing Progress and Dragon, or perhaps a new, SLS-derived logistics module, which could resupply the whole station in one mission.

== Potential uses ==
Once at Earth-Moon L_{2}, Skylab II could be a "stepping stone" for further human exploration in the Solar System, for example by being a docking site for a crewed lunar lander before the trip to the Moon. The second use would be to add a servicing capability for the astrophysics missions located near Earth-Sun L_{2}, extending the cryogenic mission lifetime of such missions by continually refilling their liquid helium and enabling some astrophysics missions which may otherwise have not been possible or would have been launched in a less-capable state.

For extravehicular activities (EVAs) near the space station, a small, one-person FlexCraft may be used in lieu of a spacesuit to improve dexterity and safety for astronauts, as well as the efficiency of EVAs. FlexCraft would eliminate the requirement of an astronaut to prebreathe the pure oxygen atmosphere in a spacesuit, reducing overhead time for EVAs significantly and enabling longer EVAs to be carried out. Additionally, FlexCraft would improve astronaut speed during EVAs, as moving around space installations would be faster and less physically demanding in automated vehicles.

== See also ==
- Lunar Gateway – a station under development from 2017 to 2026, intended to take up a near-rectilinear halo orbit about the Moon.
