= Skylab One =

Skylab One may refer to:

- Skylab I, the first generation of U.S. space stations
- Skylab 1 (SL-1), the first Skylab mission
- Skylab 2 (SLM-1), the first crewed mission to Skylab
- Skylab (album), an album by Rogério Skylab, AKA "Skylab I"

== See also ==
- Skylab (disambiguation)
