= Skylab B =

Proposed second US space station similar to Skylab

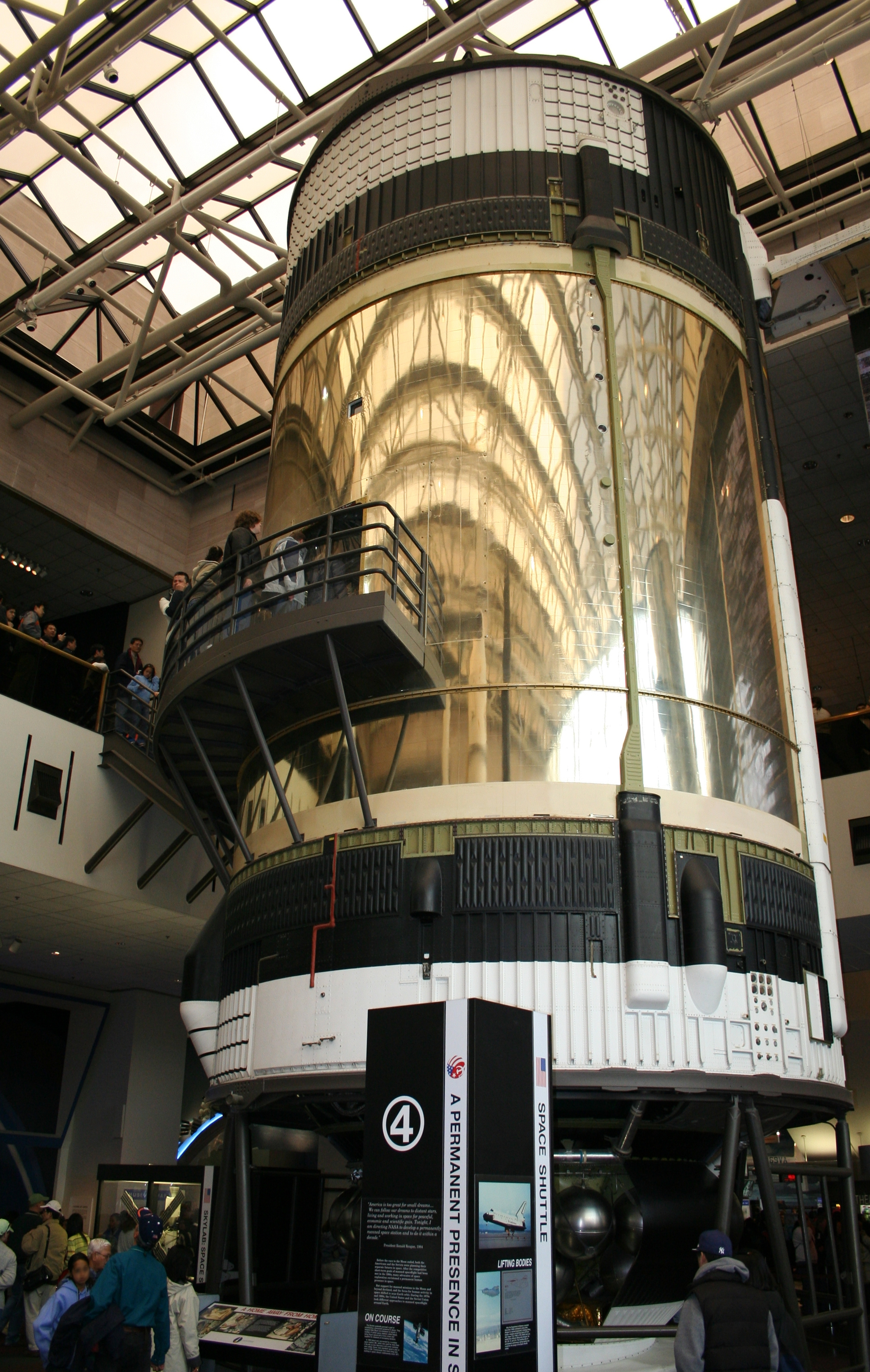
- Skylab B Orbital Workshop at the National Air and Space Museum

Station statistics
- Call sign: Skylab B, International Skylab, Advanced Skylab
- Crew: 3
- Launch: canceled (currently at the National Air and Space Museum in Washington D.C.)
- Mass: 77,088 kg
- Height: 58 feet 5 inches (17.81 m)
- Diameter: 21 feet 8 inches (6.60 m)
- Days occupied: planned 56 to 90 days

Skylab B was a proposed second US space station similar to Skylab that was planned to be launched by NASA for different purposes, mostly involving the Apollo–Soyuz Test Project, but was canceled due to lack of funding. Two Skylab modules were built in 1970 by McDonnell Douglas for the Skylab program, originally the Apollo Applications Program. The first was launched in 1973 and the other put in storage, while NASA considered how to use the remaining assets from Apollo.

One considered option was to use Saturn V SA-515 to launch the backup Skylab station into orbit sometime between January 1975 and April 1976. That way, it could expand the Apollo–Soyuz mission by 56–90 days.

Further proposals were made for an International Skylab, launched using Saturn V SA-514. This station would have been serviced by Apollo, Soyuz and later by the Space Shuttle. The vision of an international space station would not be realized until two decades later.

== Potential uses ==
Some uses considered for the second Skylab module included putting it into a rotation mode where it could generate artificial gravity and a plan to celebrate the 1976 United States Bicentennial with the launch of two Soviet Soyuz missions to the back-up Skylab.

In preparation for the Apollo–Soyuz Test Project, McDonnell Douglas proposed a massive station by combining a Salyut station with Skylab B. This would be achieved by launching an Apollo with a multiple docking adapter with 4 docking ports to be able to dock both stations and servicing vehicles (Soyuz and Apollo). The joint US-USSR mission would have possibly been called International Skylab. Modifications would have had to have been made to the Skylab B to support a mixed oxygen-nitrogen atmosphere to match the Salyut's atmosphere, or an airlock would have been needed to be installed to allow passage between the mixed atmosphere of the Soviet segment to the pure oxygen environment of the American segment.

For future missions, the station, which would have then been called the Advanced Skylab, could have been expanded by the Space Shuttle, which was due to enter service in 1979. At the time (1973) the idea was discussed, NASA still had two Saturn V launchers (SA-514 and SA-515), three Saturn IB boosters (SA-209, SA-210, SA-211), the back-up Skylab space station (Skylab B), three Apollo CSMs (CSM-117, CSM-118 and CSM-119) and two Lunar Modules in storage (LM-13, LM-14).

However, after the first Skylab was launched in May 1973, the plan for the Skylab B was canceled and the Apollo/Soyuz spacecraft had to use the Docking Module launched on the Apollo-Saturn IB for performing experiments in space. After Project Apollo ended and as NASA was moving to developing the Space Shuttle, the remaining Apollo hardware was donated to museums in 1976.

== Possible crew ==
It was expected at the time by those involved that the initial crew would be the crew which served as backup for Skylab 3 and Skylab 4, and was kept in reserve for the Skylab Rescue mission (minus the science pilot):

Position	Astronaut
Commander	Vance D. Brand
Science Pilot	William Lenoir
Pilot	Don L. Lind

== Existing hardware ==
=== Apollo CSM ===
The Apollo Command Module CSM-119 was originally used for Skylab Rescue. It is on display at Kennedy Space Center.

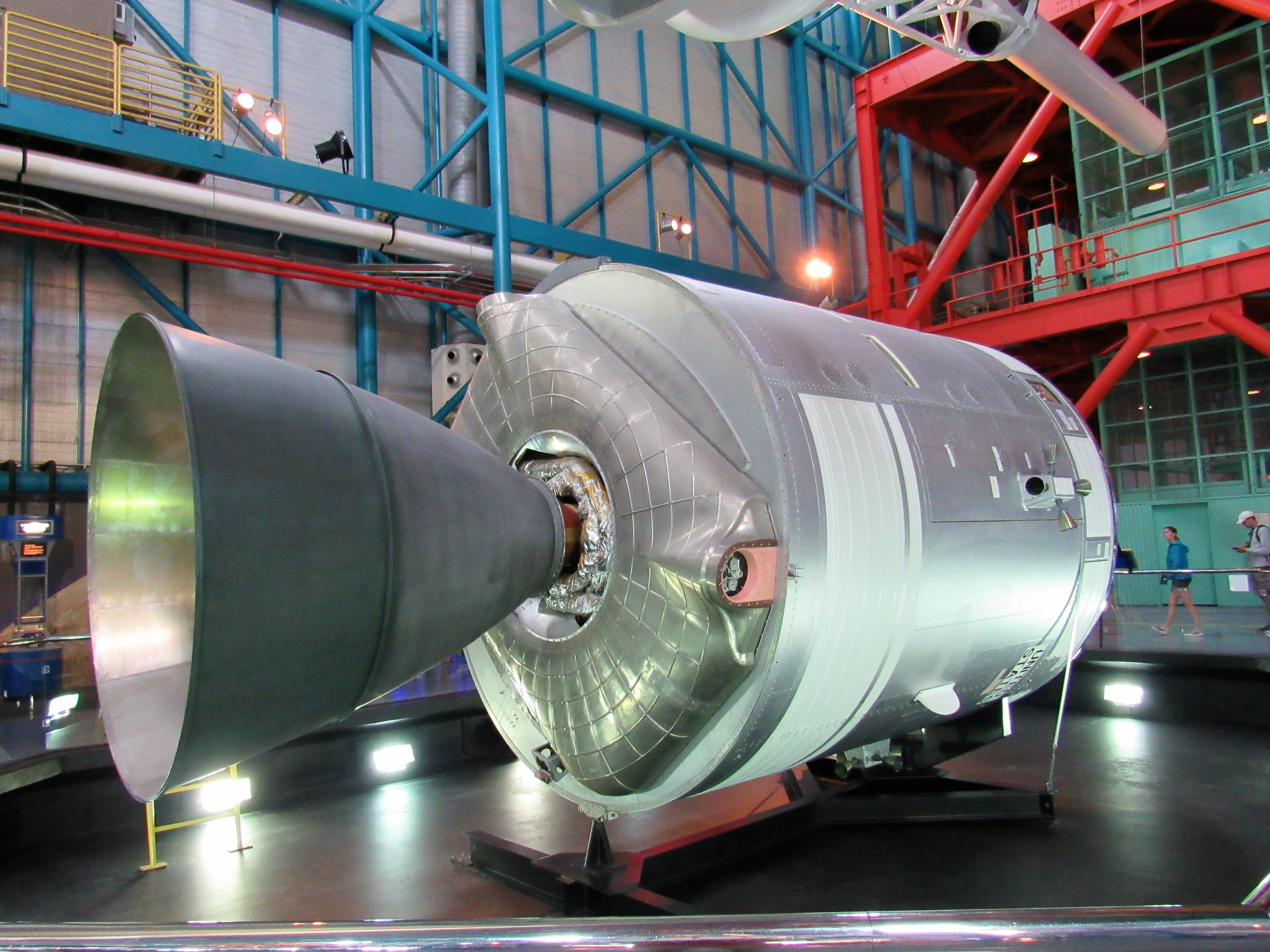

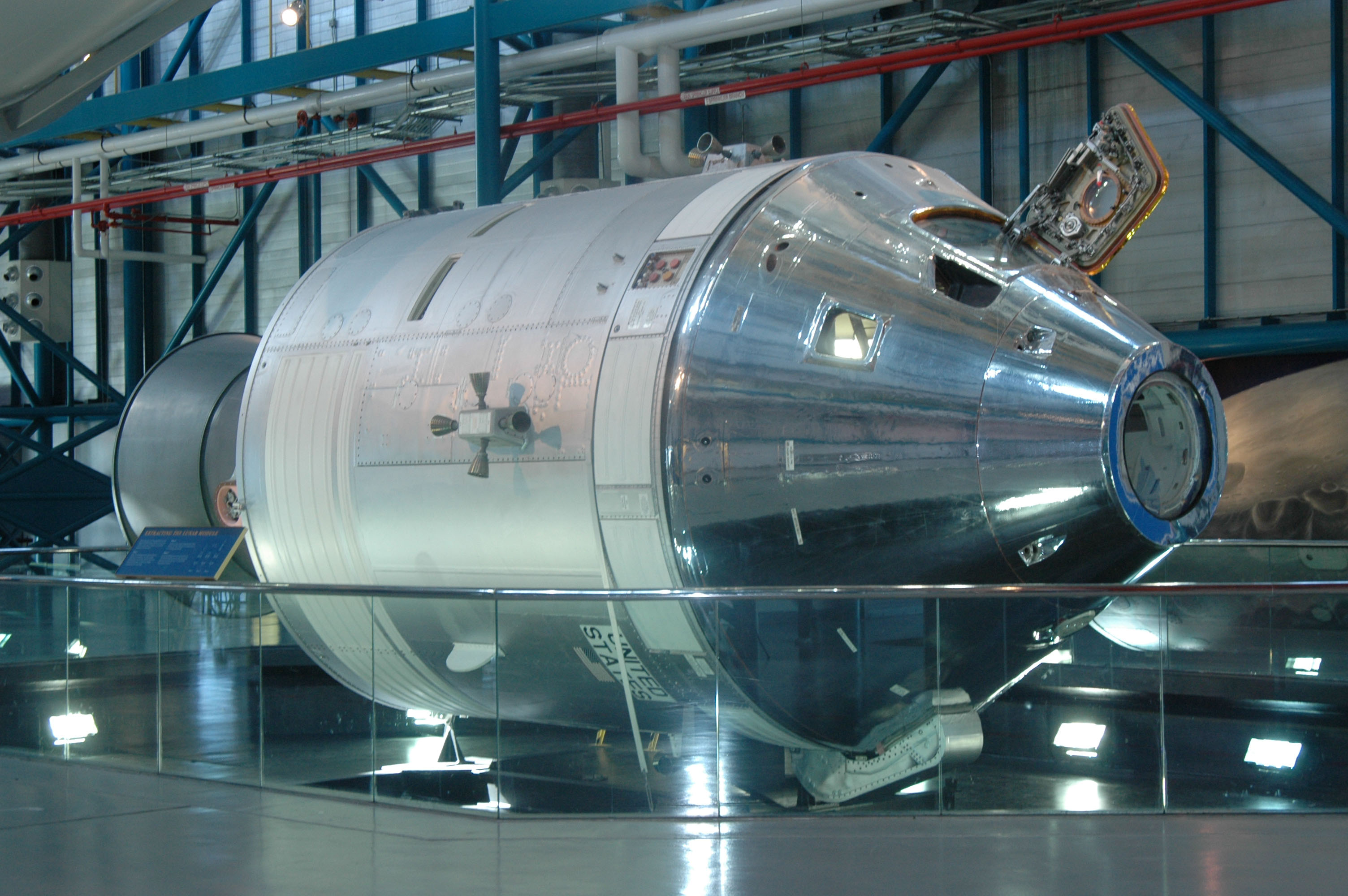

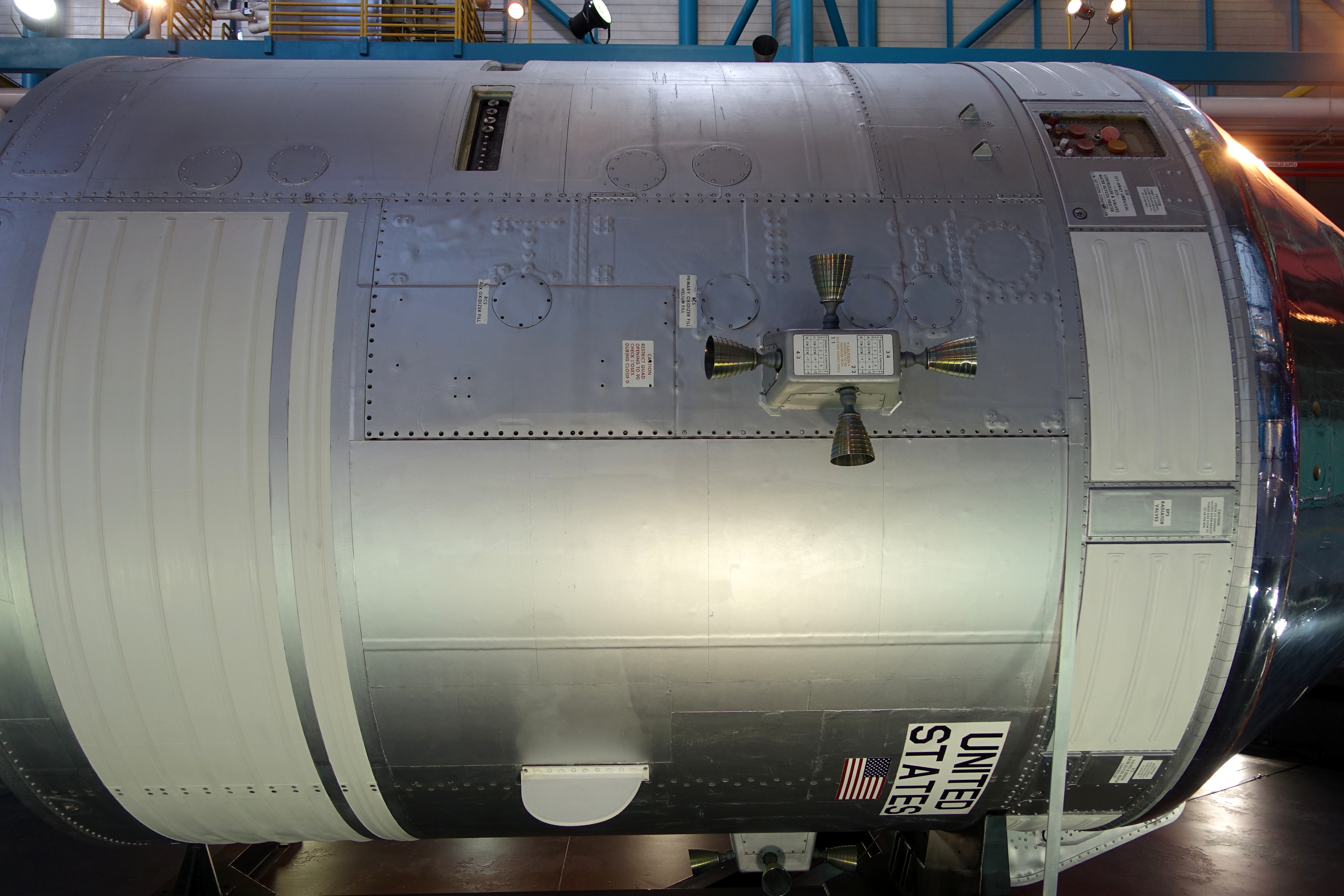

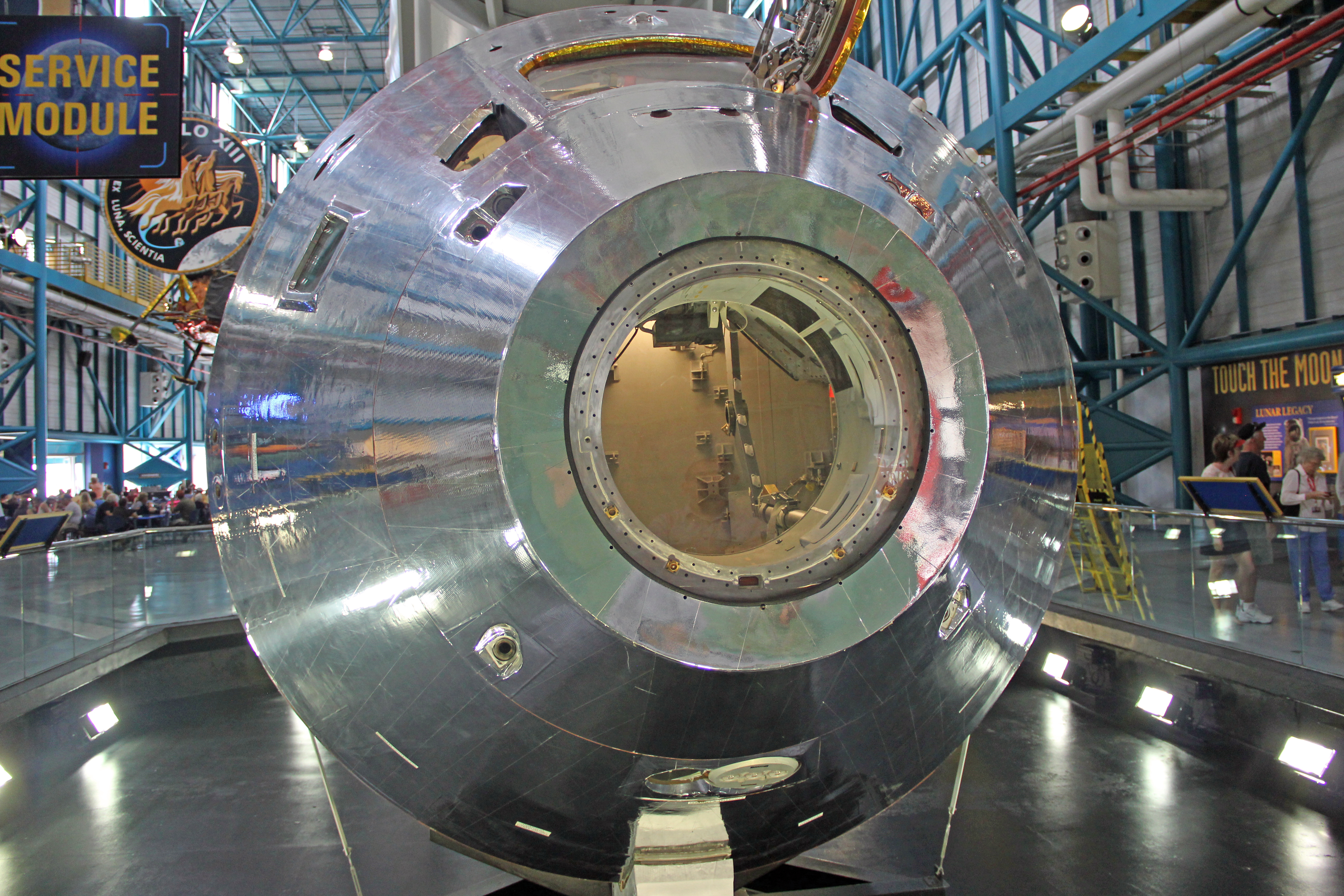

=== Saturn IB ===
Saturn IB SA-209 was originally used for Skylab Rescue.

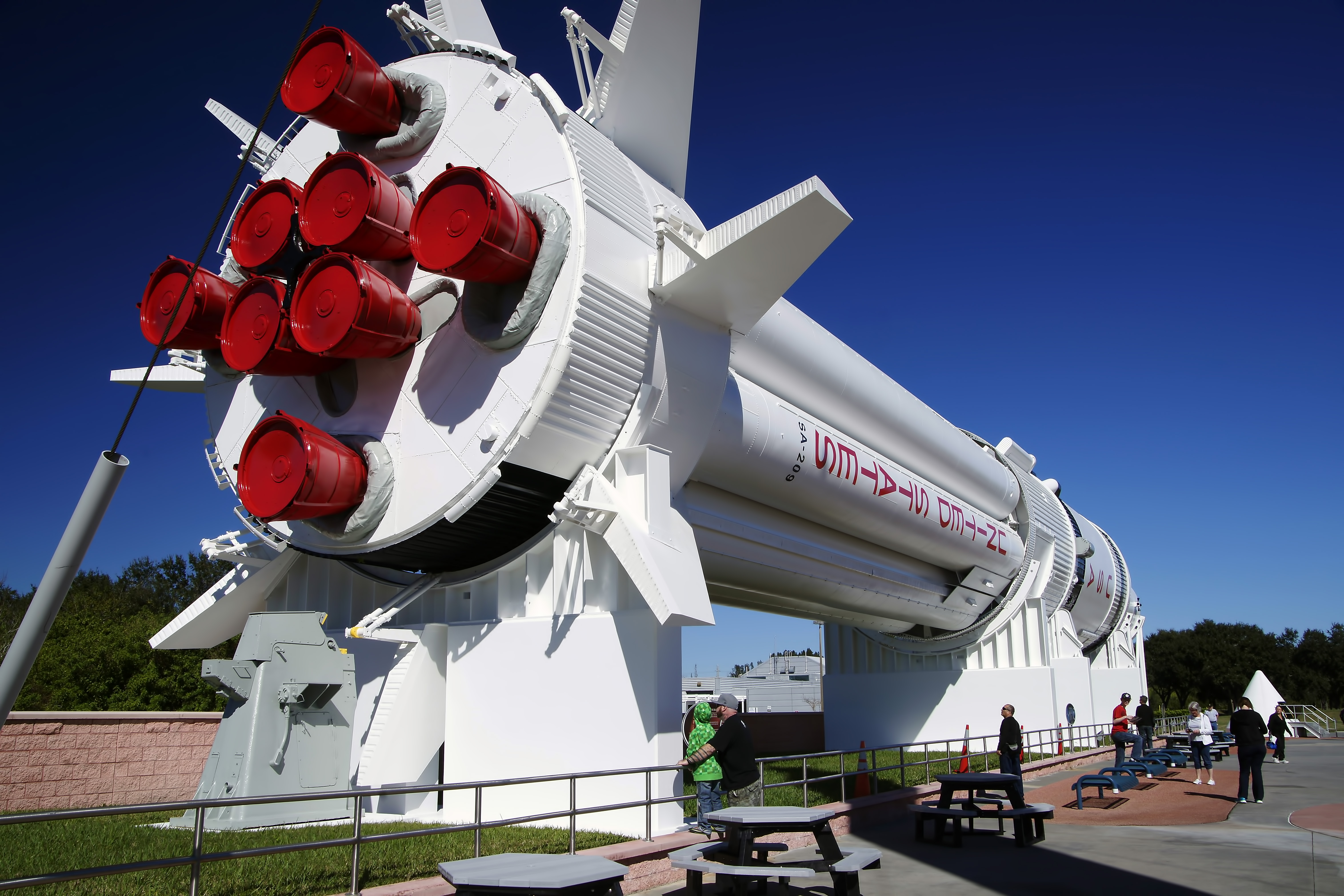
Saturn IB (SA-209) at the Kennedy Space Center Visitor Complex.

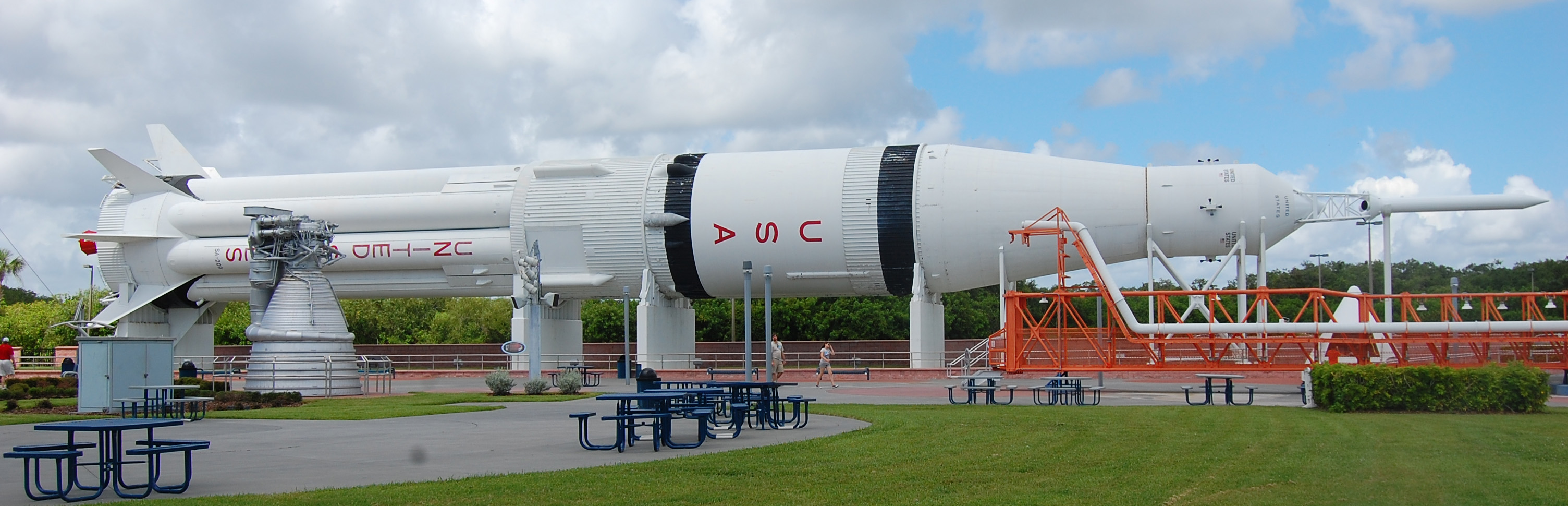
Saturn IB (SA-209) side view.

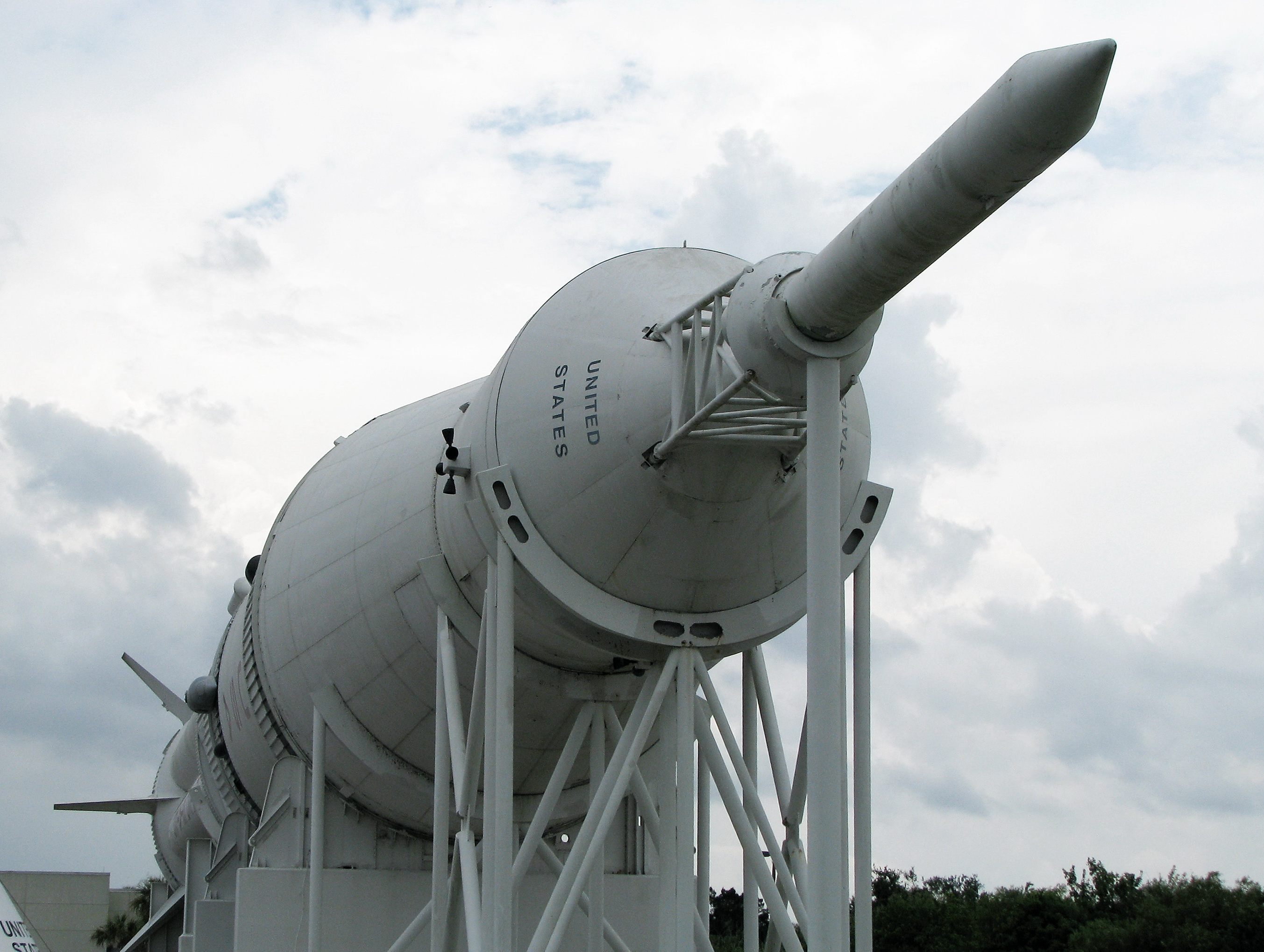
Saturn IB (SA-209) front view.

=== Saturn V ===
The Saturn V SA-514 was originally designated for canceled Apollo 19. It was proposed for launching an International Skylab. This station would have been serviced by Apollo, Soyuz and later by the Space Shuttle.

- First stage (S-IC-14) on display at Johnson Space Center, second and third stages (S-II-14, S-IVB-514) on display at Kennedy Space Center.
- The S-II interstage is located at Parque de las Ciencias in Bayamón, Puerto Rico (visible on satellite images at 18.410863°N 66.160027°W).
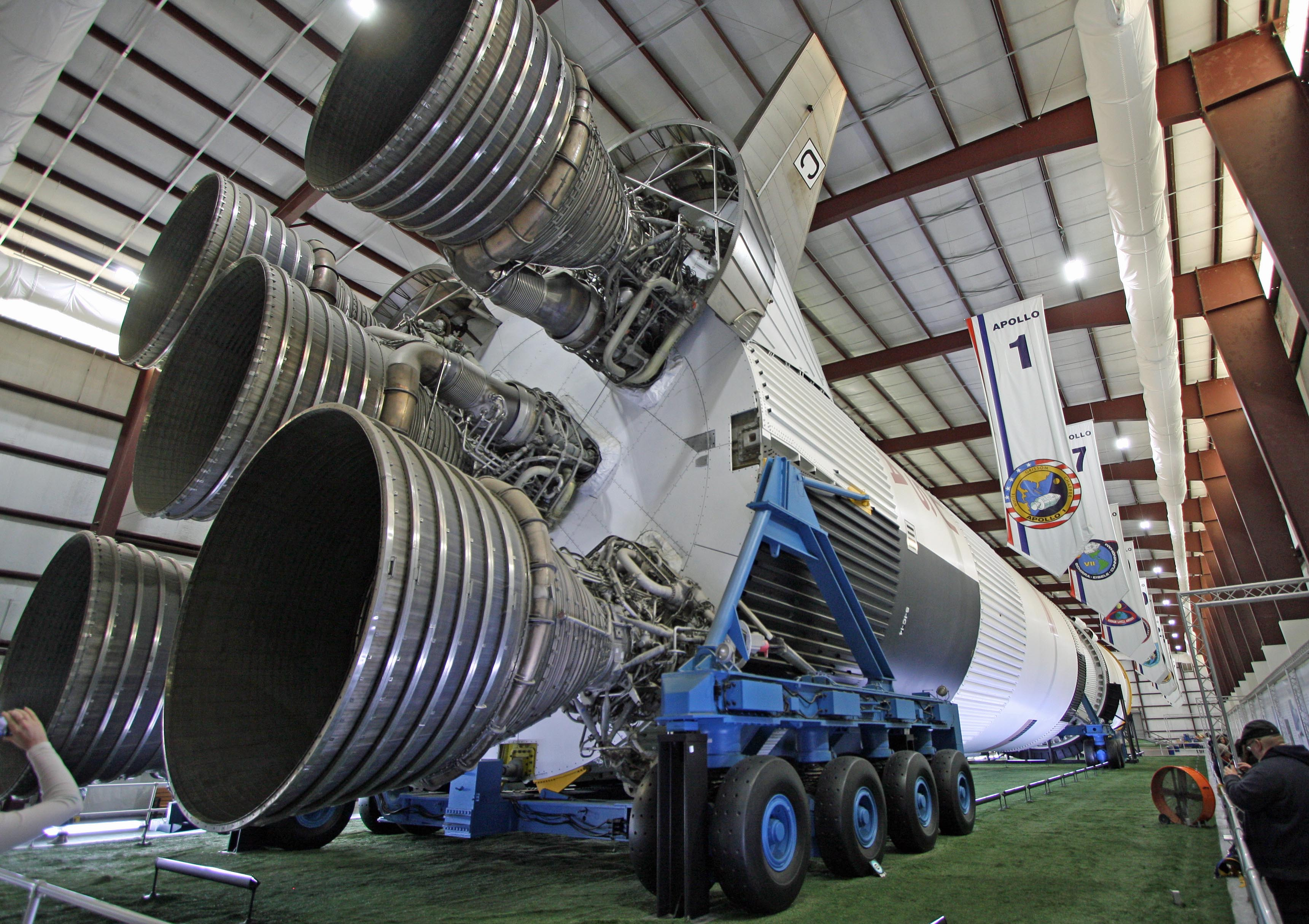
S-IC-14 on display at Johnson Space Center

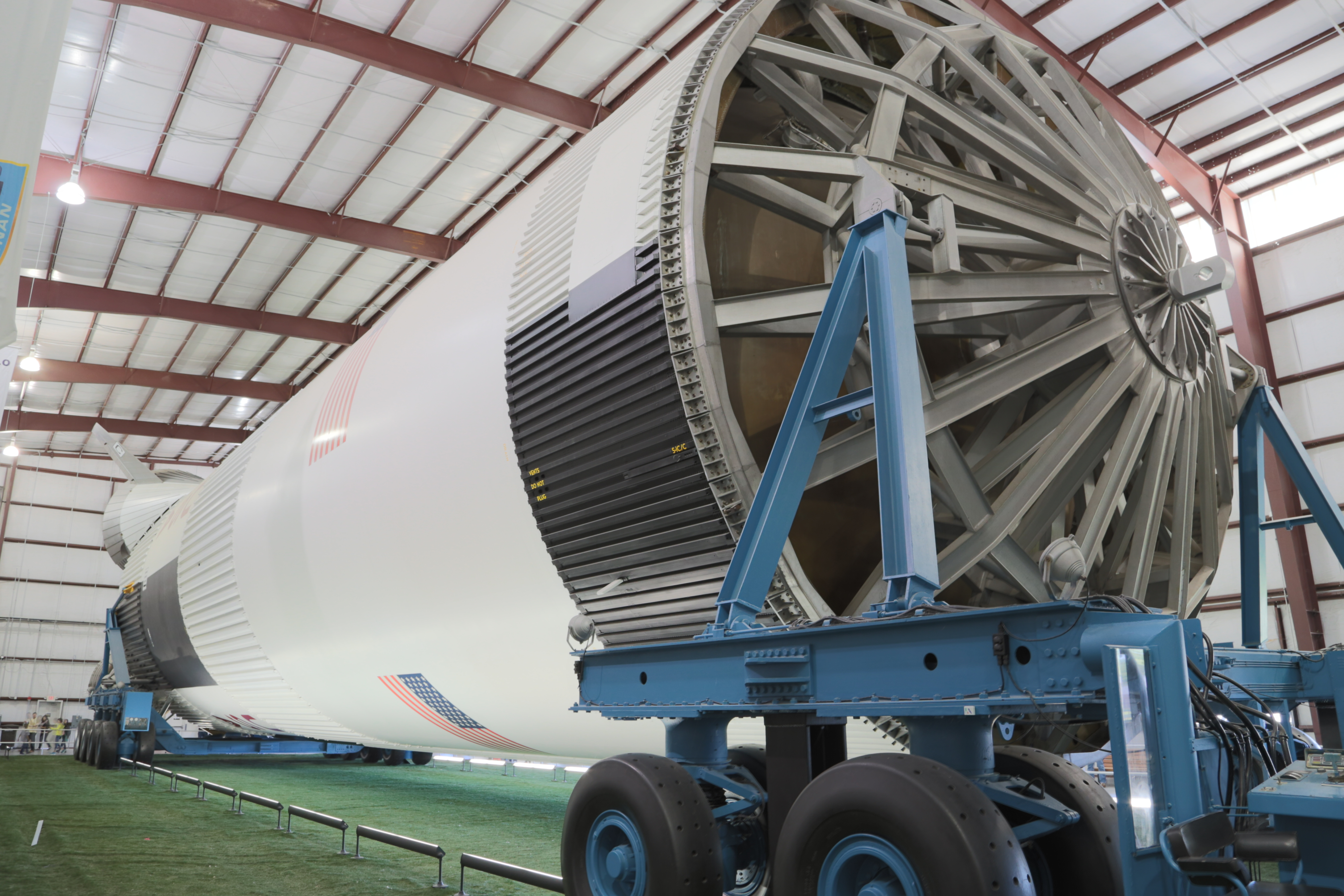
S-IC-14 on display at Johnson Space Center

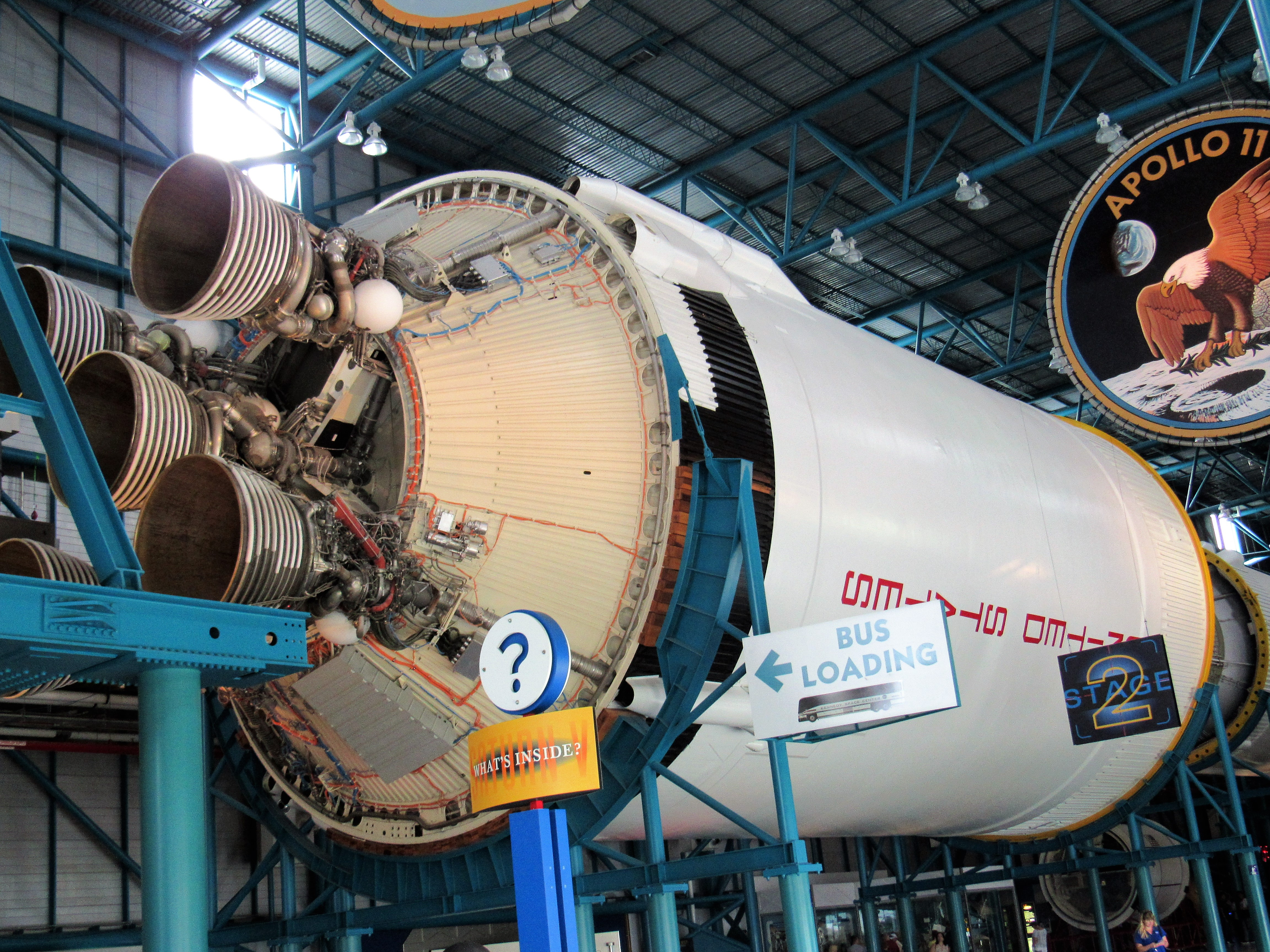
S-II-14 on display at Kennedy Space Center

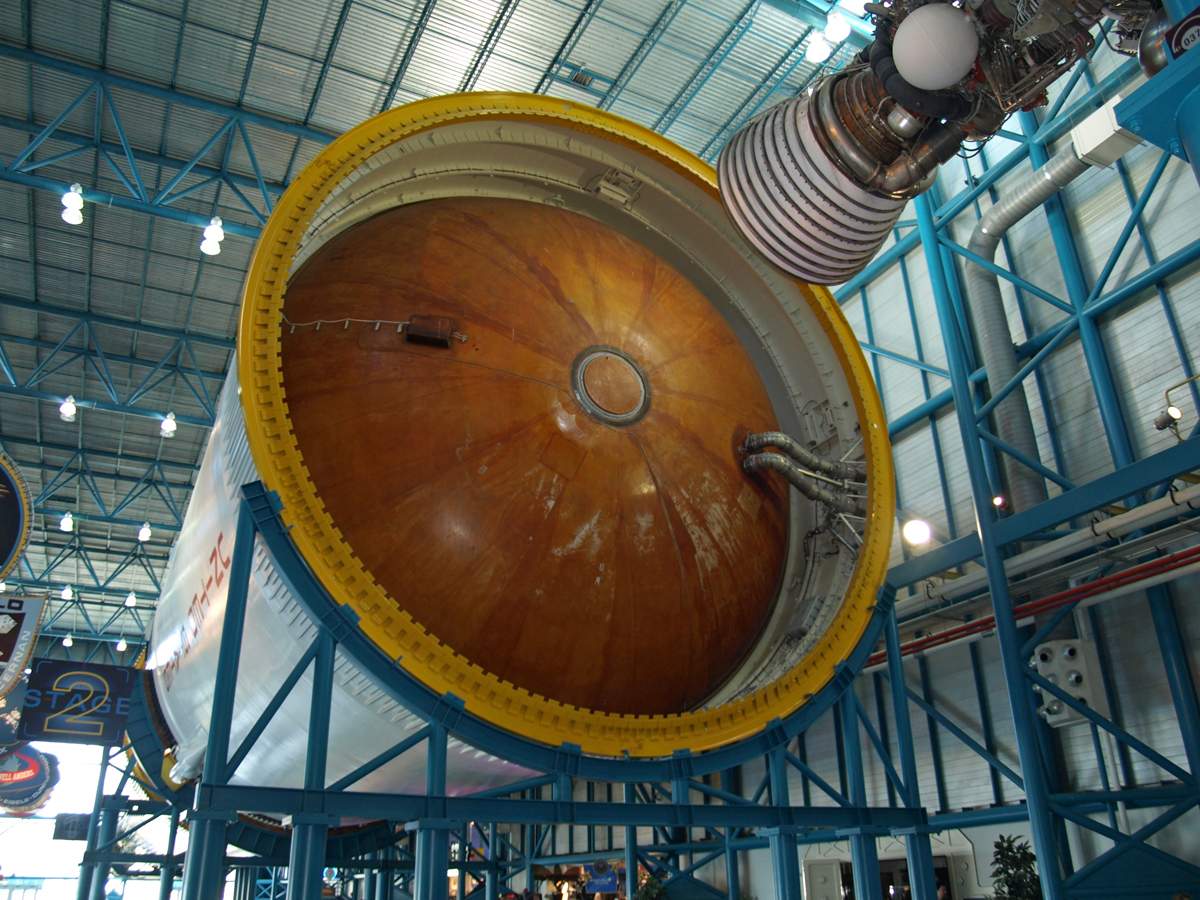
S-II-14 on display at Kennedy Space Center

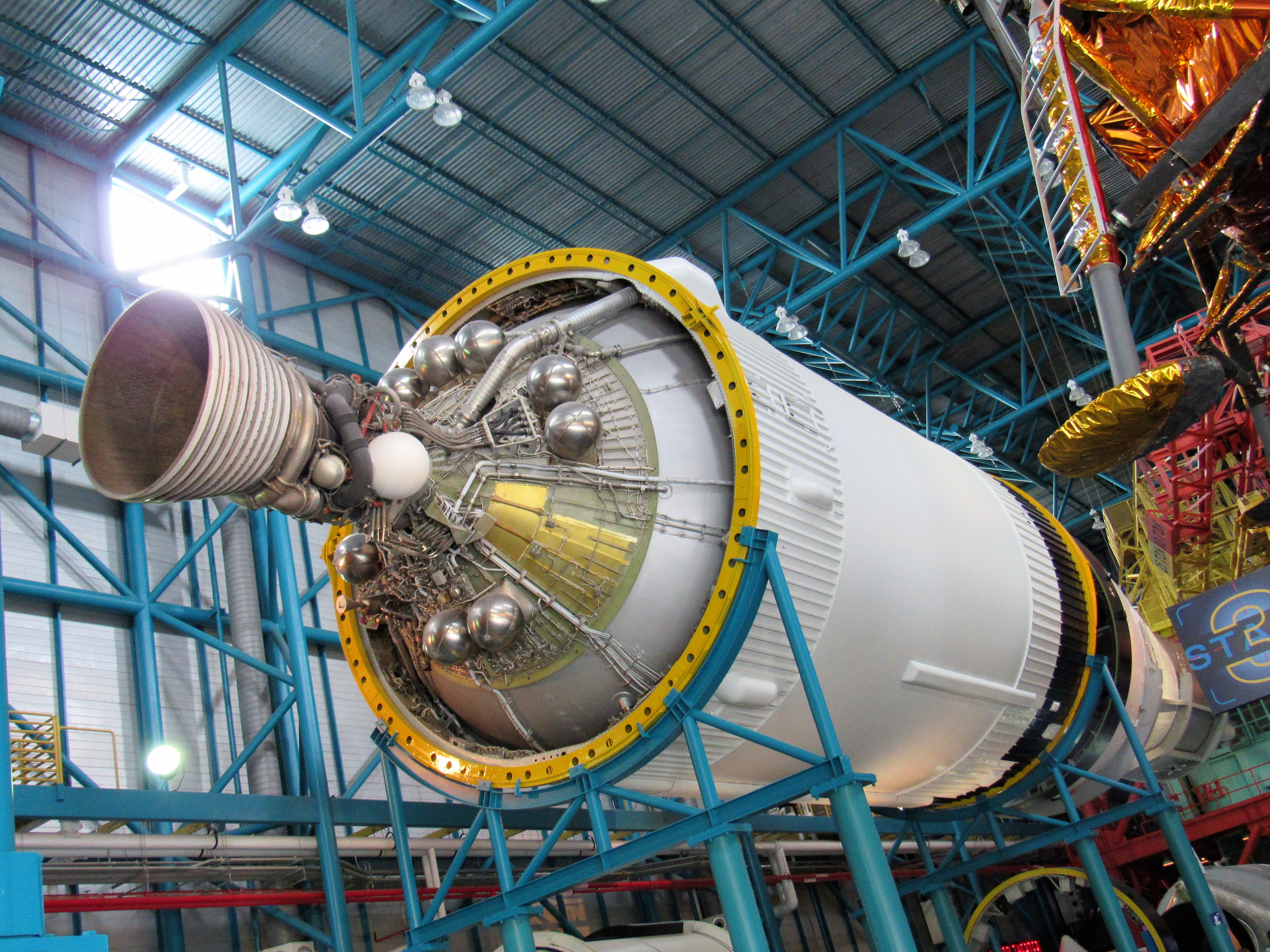
S-IVB-514 on display at Kennedy Space Center

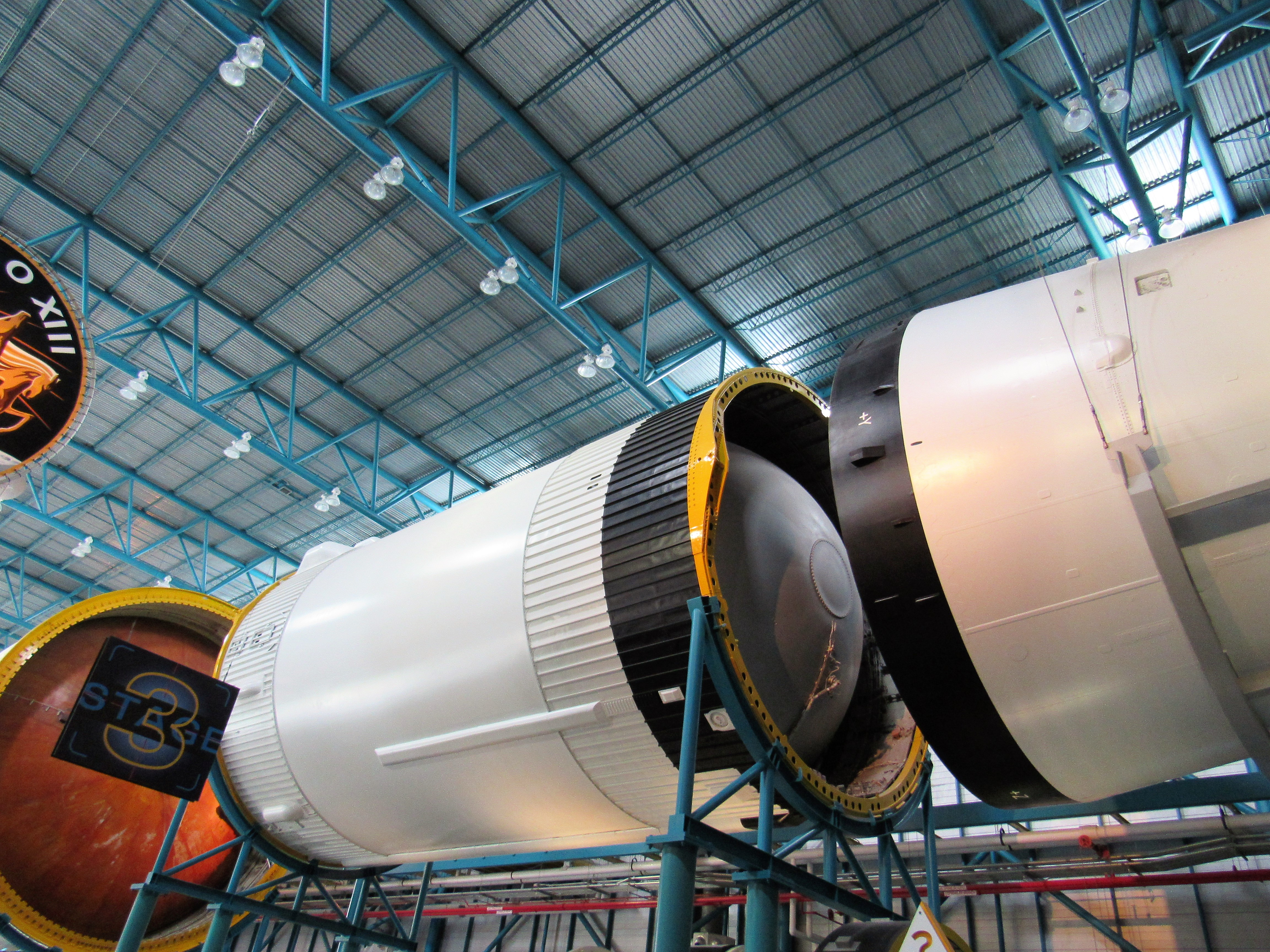
S-IVB-514 on display at Kennedy Space Center

Saturn V SA-515 was originally designated for Apollo 20, and later to launch the backup Skylab station into orbit sometime between January 1975 and April 1976. That way, it could expand the Apollo–Soyuz mission by 56–90 days.

- The first stage (S-IC-15) was on display at Michoud Assembly Facility through June 2016. This was then moved to the Infinity Science Center in Pearlington MS.
- The second stage (S-II-15) is on display at Johnson Space Center.
- The third stage (S-IVB-515) is the Skylab B Orbital Workshop on display at the National Air and Space Museum. On display in the museum's Space Hall since 1976, the orbital workshop has been slightly modified to permit viewers to walk through the living quarters.
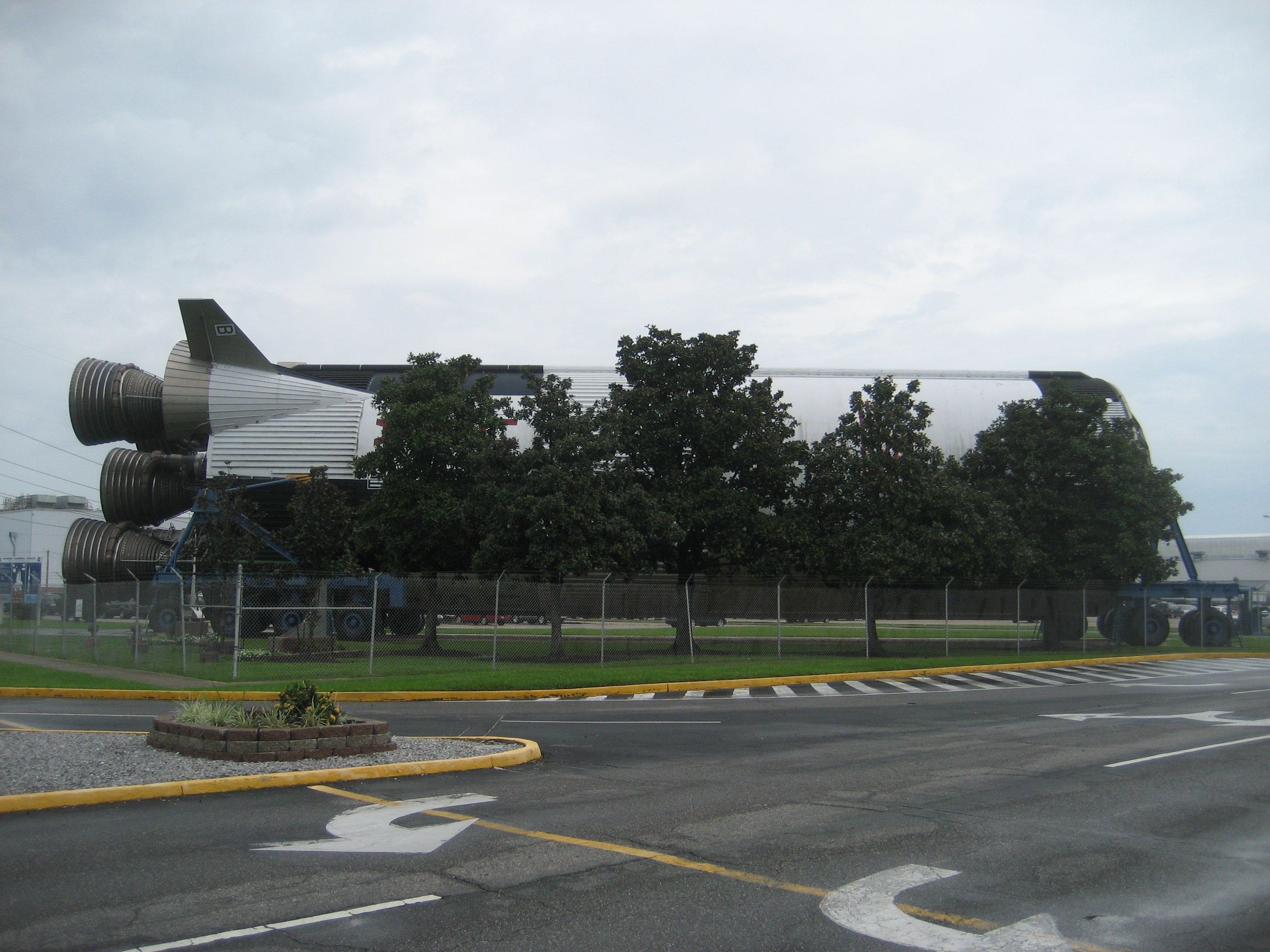
S-IC-15 on display at Michoud Assembly Facility

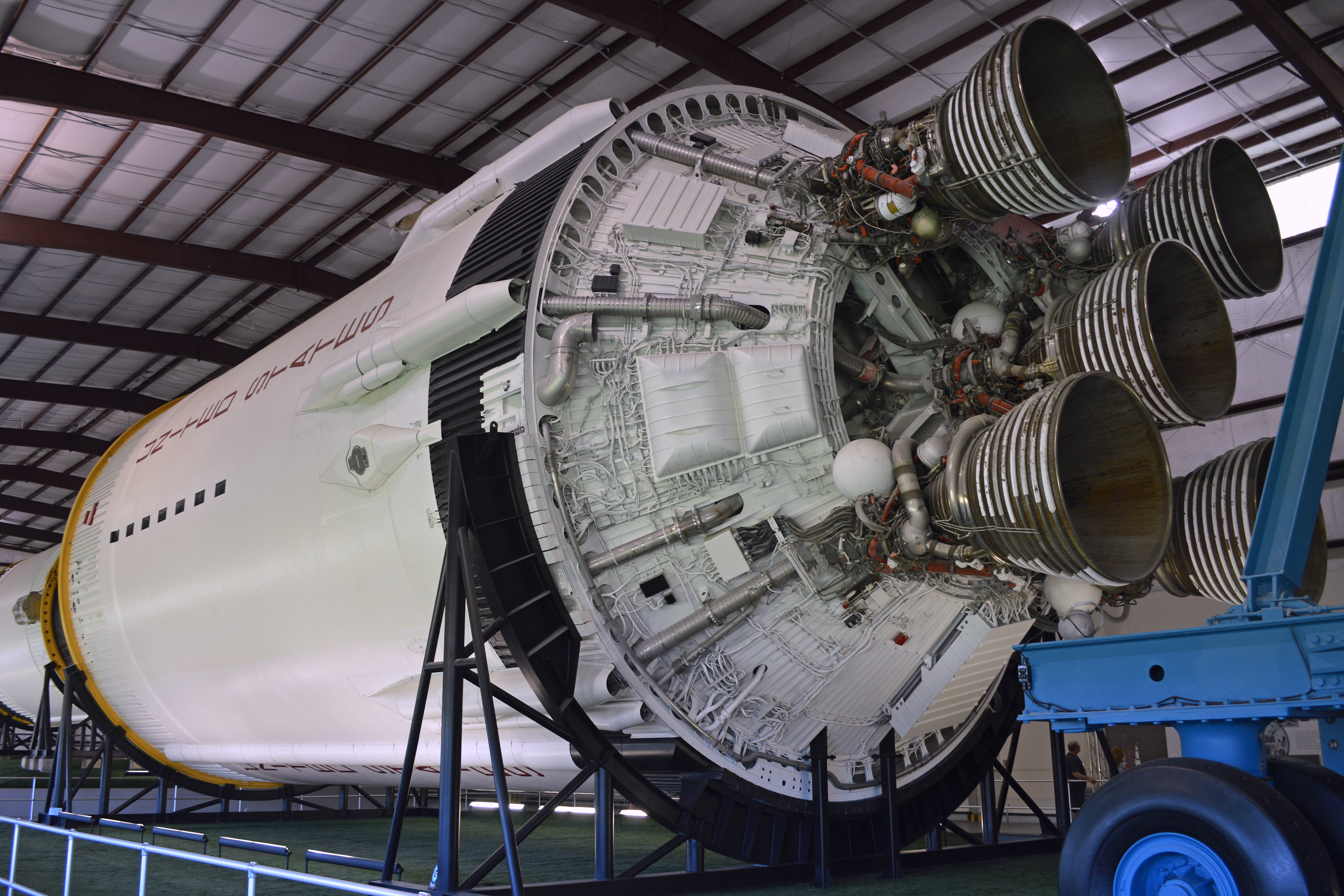
S-II-15 on display at Johnson Space Center

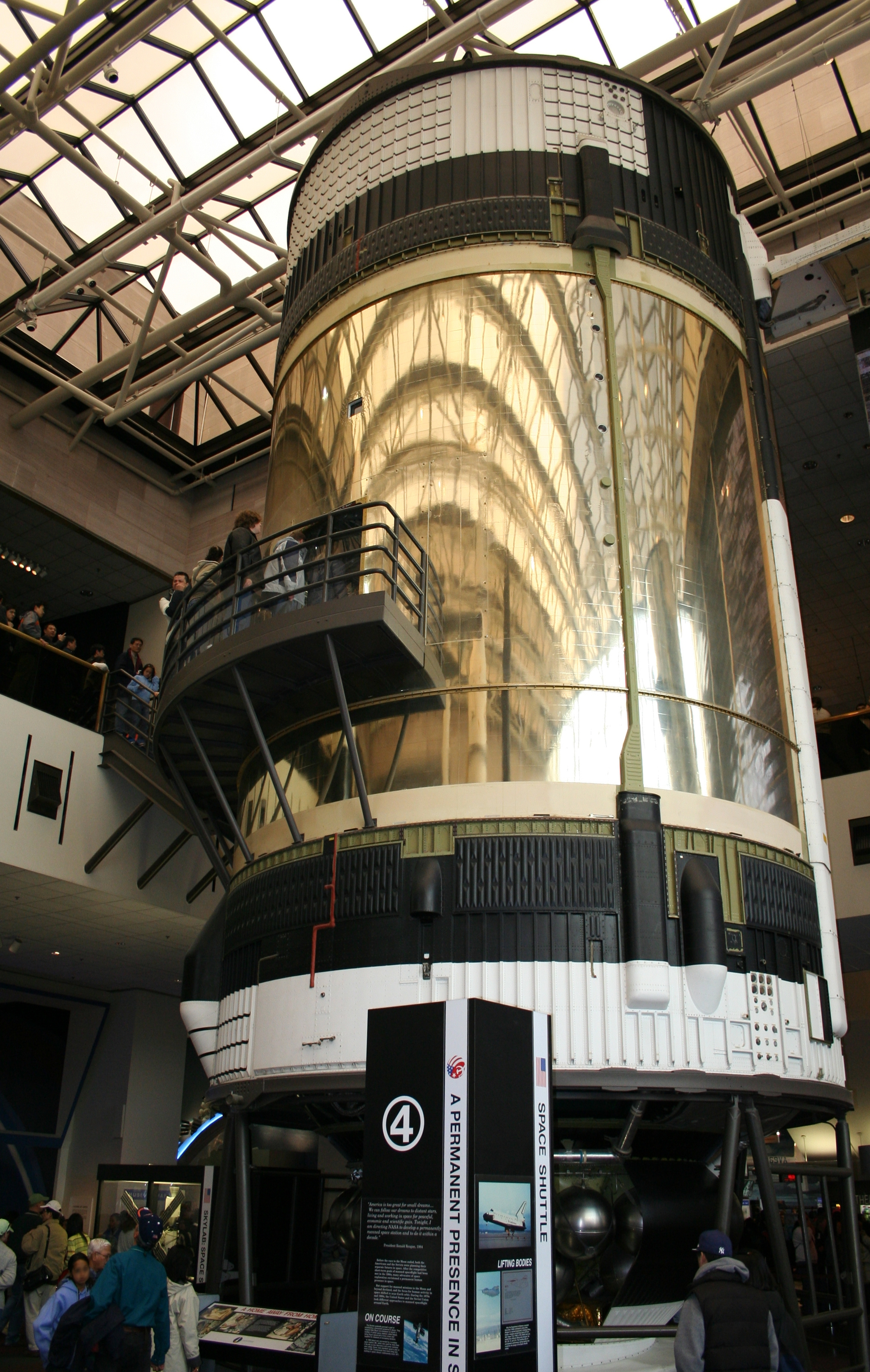
Skylab B Orbital Workshop (S-IVB-515) at the National Air and Space Museum

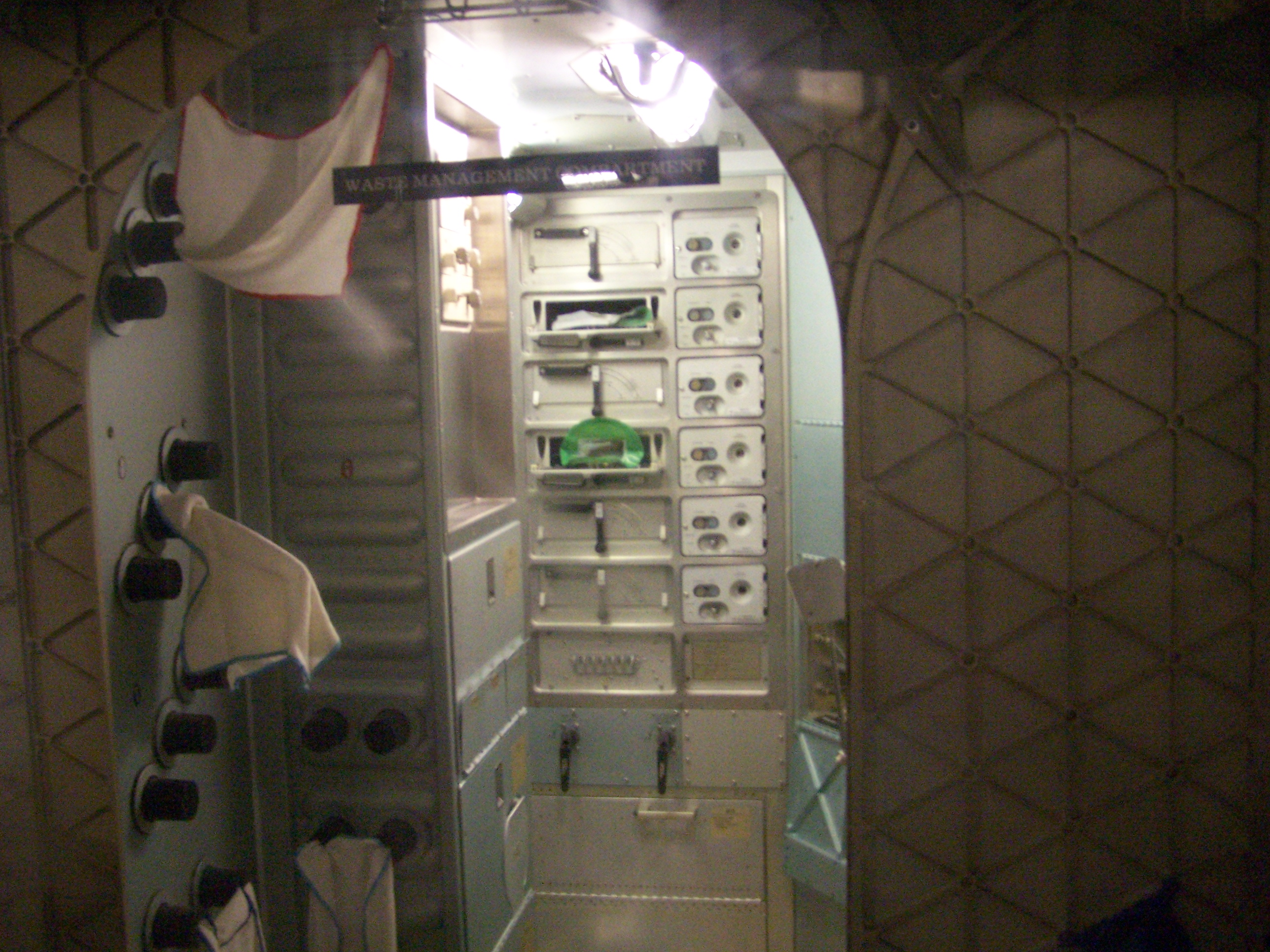
The waste management facilities in Skylab B (S-IVB-515) at the National Air and Space Museum.

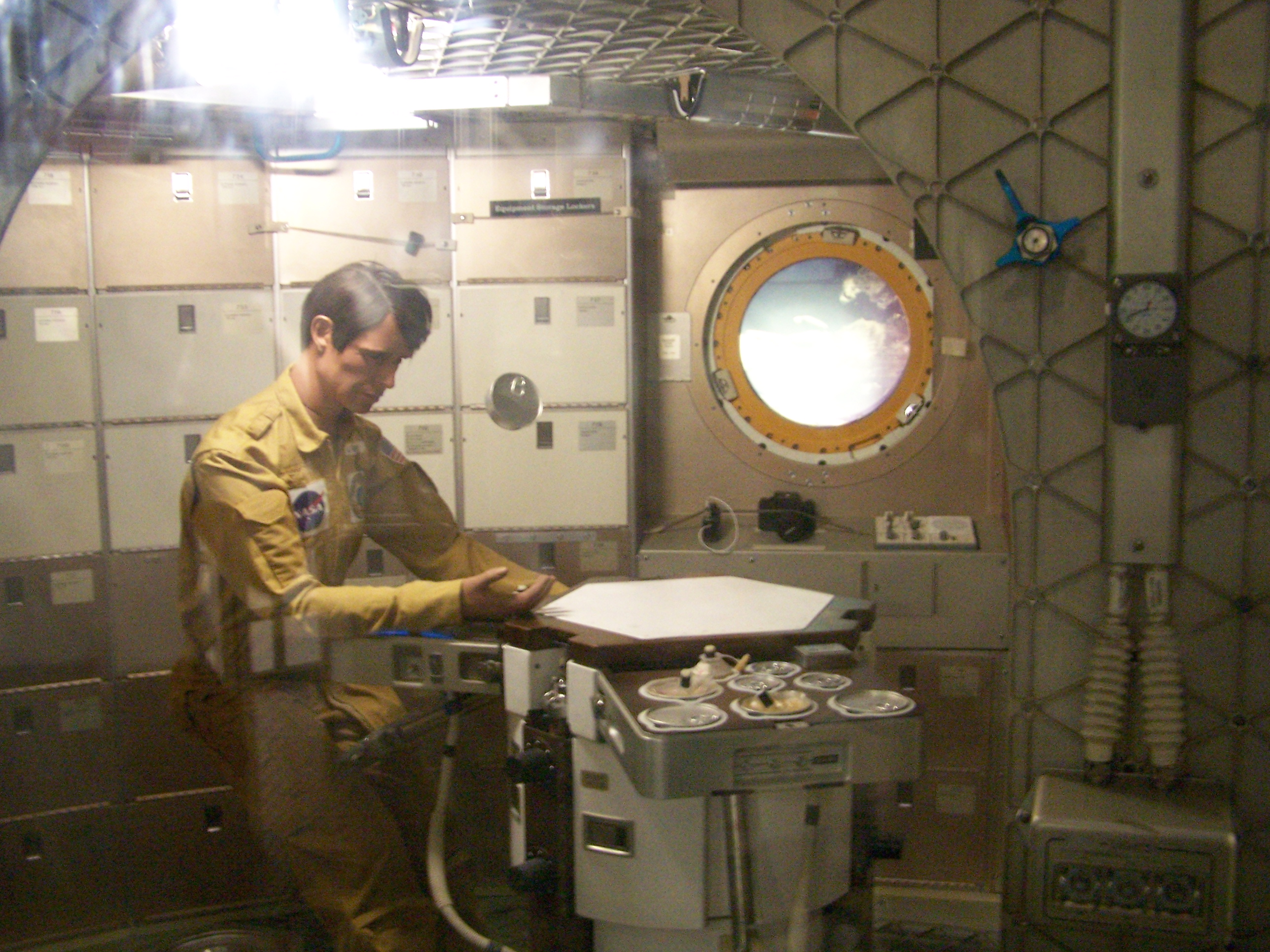
A mannequin astronaut models dining aboard the Skylab B (S-IVB-515) at the NASM.

=== Airlock Module ===
An Airlock Module is on display at the Evergreen Aviation & Space Museum. The EVA Hatch is actually a repurposed Gemini hatch, used as a way to feign reduced development costs by reusing old hardware.

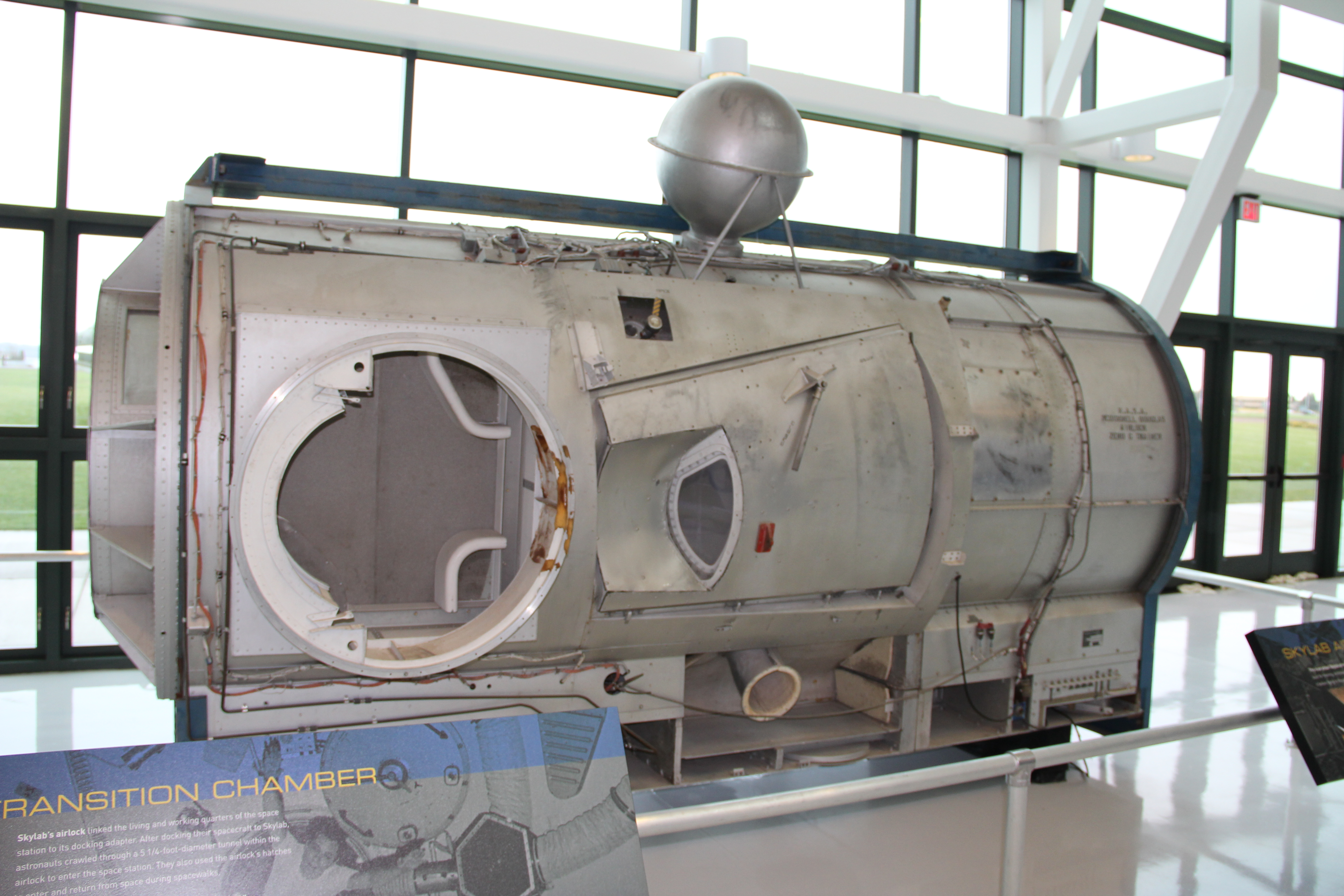

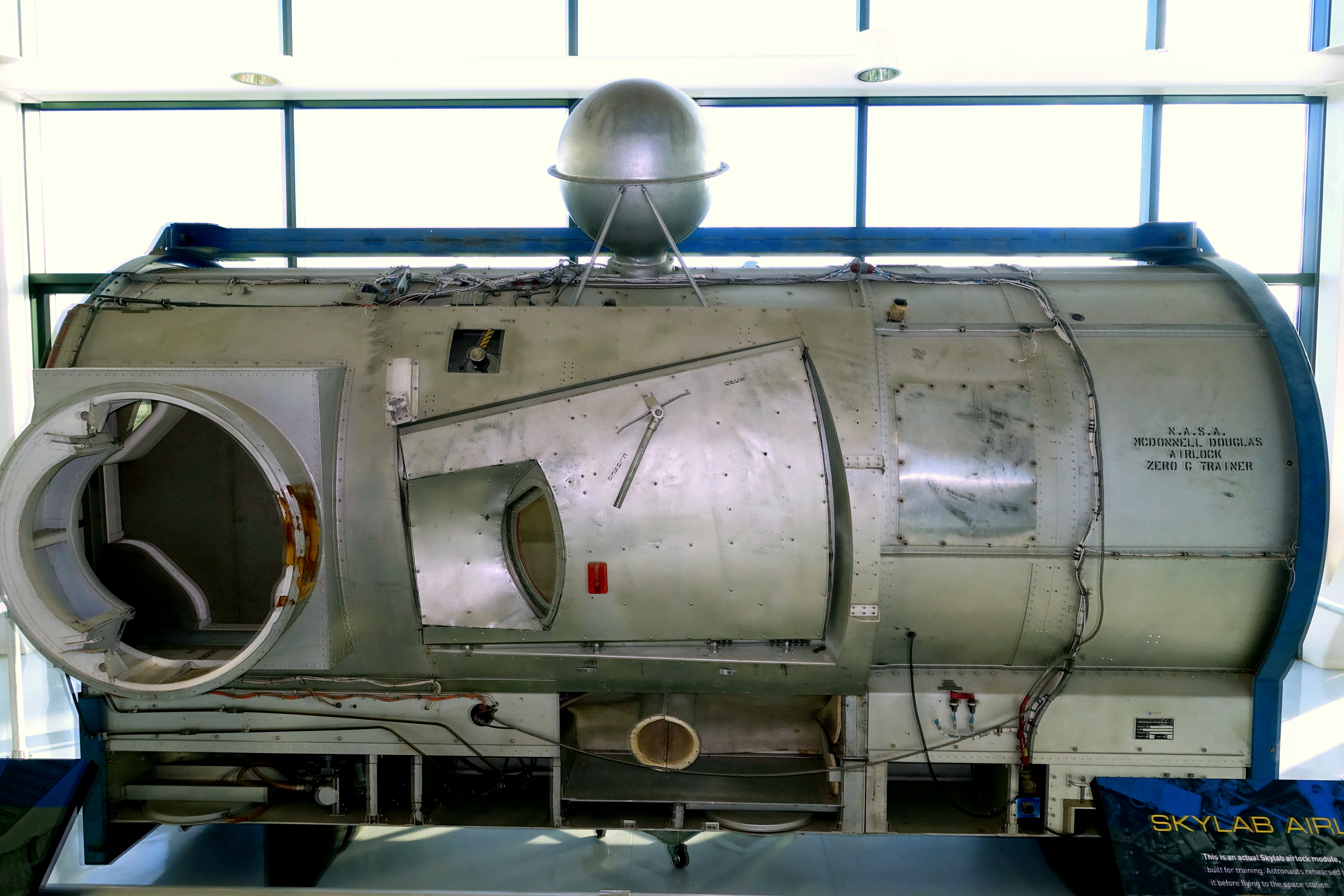

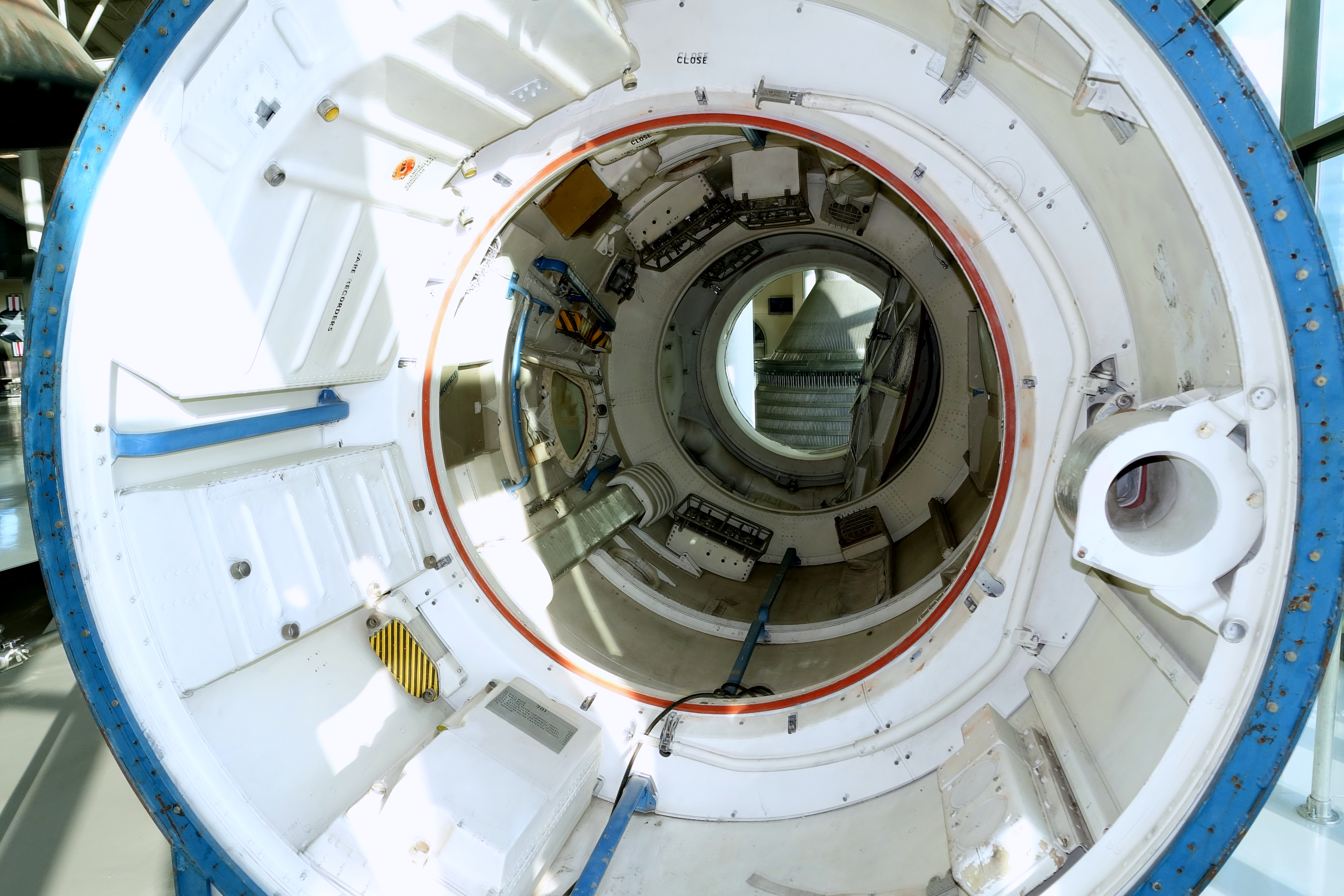

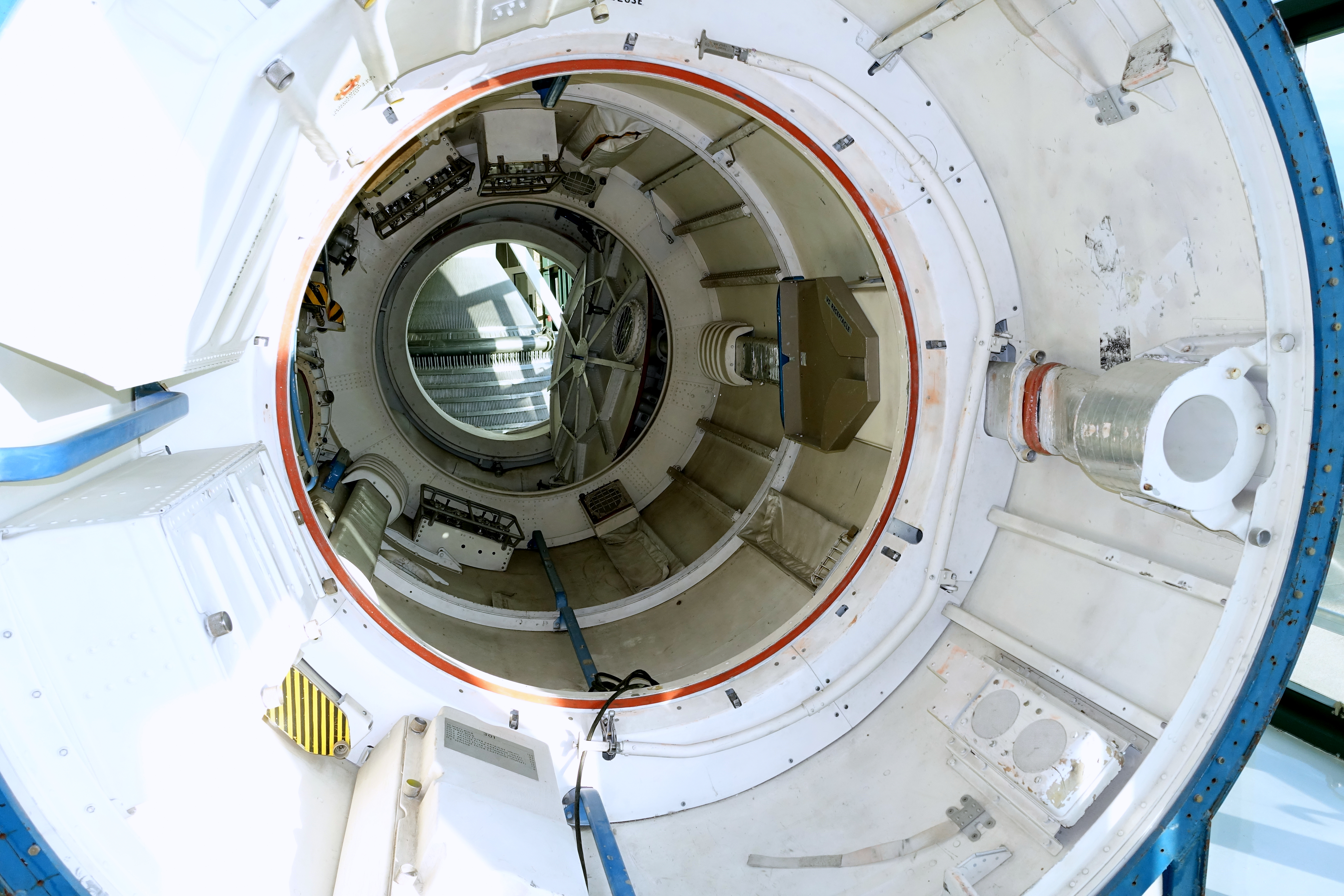

=== Multiple Docking Adapter ===
Multiple Docking Adapter is on display at the Kennedy Space Center Visitor Complex.

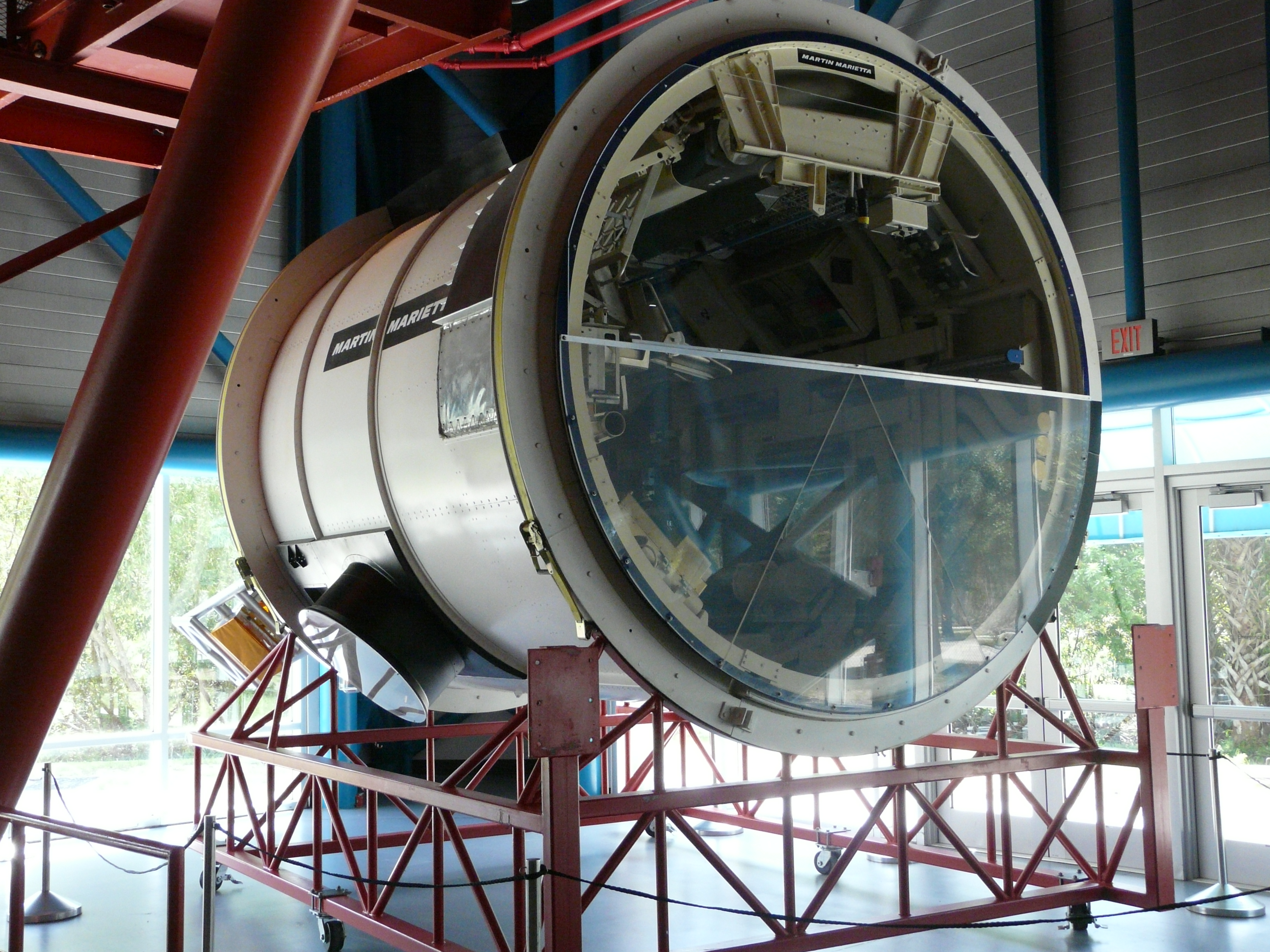
Multiple Docking Adapter at Kennedy Space Center Visitor Complex
