= Skylab Gallery =

Gallery and performance space in Columbus, Ohio

Coordinates: 39°57′49″N 82°59′57″W

Skylab Gallery is an independently run gallery and performance space in downtown Columbus, Ohio. It is currently located at 57 E Gay St, Fl 5th, Columbus, OH, United States. It has been active since the year 2000, serving as an exhibition space for the independent art community in Columbus. The Space Station Skylab has most notably been a venue for the contemporary underground experimental music and noise rock scene, hosting local, national, and international performers.

== Notable performances ==
Notable musicians and groups who have performed at Skylab Gallery include The Skaters, Wolf Eyes, Emeralds, Prurient, Mark McGuire, Byron Westbrook, Extreme Animals, Lukas Ligeti, Leslie Keffer, Neptune, Foot Village, C Spencer Yeh, Burning Star Core, the White Mice, Sword Heaven, The Laundry Room Squelchers, Daniel Higgs, Rocco Di Pietro, Nautical Almanac, Mike Shiflet, Times New Viking, Valley Girls, and Japanther.

=== Avant Writing Symposium ===
In 2010 Skylab hosted a Visual Poetry and Mailart Exhibition as part of the International Avant Writing Symposium curated by the poet John M. Bennett.

=== Other exhibitions ===
Brooklyn, New York based illustrator and artist John Malta held his first solo exhibition, entitled "Be Safe My Little Viking" at Skylab in 2009.

In 2009, Skylab and The Shelf Galleries were host to "28 Windows", a multimedia video installation in which video art was projected on all 28 windows of the Skylab building. The project was curated by former Shelf curator Nathan Ober.
